

87001–87100 

|-bgcolor=#E9E9E9
| 87001 ||  || — || May 7, 2000 || Socorro || LINEAR || MIT || align=right | 3.3 km || 
|-id=002 bgcolor=#E9E9E9
| 87002 ||  || — || May 7, 2000 || Socorro || LINEAR || — || align=right | 2.6 km || 
|-id=003 bgcolor=#fefefe
| 87003 ||  || — || May 7, 2000 || Socorro || LINEAR || NYS || align=right | 3.1 km || 
|-id=004 bgcolor=#fefefe
| 87004 ||  || — || May 9, 2000 || Socorro || LINEAR || V || align=right | 1.5 km || 
|-id=005 bgcolor=#FA8072
| 87005 ||  || — || May 9, 2000 || Socorro || LINEAR || — || align=right | 2.5 km || 
|-id=006 bgcolor=#E9E9E9
| 87006 ||  || — || May 11, 2000 || Socorro || LINEAR || PAL || align=right | 6.1 km || 
|-id=007 bgcolor=#fefefe
| 87007 ||  || — || May 6, 2000 || Socorro || LINEAR || — || align=right | 2.2 km || 
|-id=008 bgcolor=#fefefe
| 87008 ||  || — || May 6, 2000 || Socorro || LINEAR || V || align=right | 1.6 km || 
|-id=009 bgcolor=#fefefe
| 87009 ||  || — || May 6, 2000 || Socorro || LINEAR || — || align=right | 2.0 km || 
|-id=010 bgcolor=#fefefe
| 87010 ||  || — || May 6, 2000 || Socorro || LINEAR || — || align=right | 2.2 km || 
|-id=011 bgcolor=#E9E9E9
| 87011 ||  || — || May 6, 2000 || Socorro || LINEAR || — || align=right | 2.1 km || 
|-id=012 bgcolor=#E9E9E9
| 87012 ||  || — || May 6, 2000 || Socorro || LINEAR || — || align=right | 2.9 km || 
|-id=013 bgcolor=#fefefe
| 87013 ||  || — || May 6, 2000 || Socorro || LINEAR || V || align=right | 1.8 km || 
|-id=014 bgcolor=#fefefe
| 87014 ||  || — || May 6, 2000 || Socorro || LINEAR || — || align=right | 2.9 km || 
|-id=015 bgcolor=#fefefe
| 87015 ||  || — || May 6, 2000 || Socorro || LINEAR || — || align=right | 2.0 km || 
|-id=016 bgcolor=#E9E9E9
| 87016 ||  || — || May 7, 2000 || Socorro || LINEAR || — || align=right | 3.4 km || 
|-id=017 bgcolor=#fefefe
| 87017 ||  || — || May 9, 2000 || Socorro || LINEAR || — || align=right | 1.6 km || 
|-id=018 bgcolor=#fefefe
| 87018 ||  || — || May 9, 2000 || Socorro || LINEAR || FLO || align=right | 2.4 km || 
|-id=019 bgcolor=#E9E9E9
| 87019 ||  || — || May 10, 2000 || Socorro || LINEAR || — || align=right | 2.1 km || 
|-id=020 bgcolor=#fefefe
| 87020 ||  || — || May 10, 2000 || Socorro || LINEAR || — || align=right | 1.9 km || 
|-id=021 bgcolor=#fefefe
| 87021 ||  || — || May 6, 2000 || Socorro || LINEAR || — || align=right | 3.2 km || 
|-id=022 bgcolor=#fefefe
| 87022 ||  || — || May 6, 2000 || Socorro || LINEAR || — || align=right | 2.2 km || 
|-id=023 bgcolor=#fefefe
| 87023 ||  || — || May 6, 2000 || Socorro || LINEAR || — || align=right | 1.9 km || 
|-id=024 bgcolor=#FFC2E0
| 87024 ||  || — || May 5, 2000 || Socorro || LINEAR || APO || align=right data-sort-value="0.65" | 650 m || 
|-id=025 bgcolor=#FFC2E0
| 87025 ||  || — || May 7, 2000 || Anderson Mesa || LONEOS || APO +1km || align=right data-sort-value="0.83" | 830 m || 
|-id=026 bgcolor=#fefefe
| 87026 ||  || — || May 6, 2000 || Socorro || LINEAR || — || align=right | 1.6 km || 
|-id=027 bgcolor=#fefefe
| 87027 ||  || — || May 7, 2000 || Socorro || LINEAR || NYS || align=right | 1.5 km || 
|-id=028 bgcolor=#fefefe
| 87028 ||  || — || May 9, 2000 || Socorro || LINEAR || FLO || align=right | 2.0 km || 
|-id=029 bgcolor=#E9E9E9
| 87029 ||  || — || May 9, 2000 || Socorro || LINEAR || — || align=right | 2.0 km || 
|-id=030 bgcolor=#fefefe
| 87030 ||  || — || May 7, 2000 || Socorro || LINEAR || NYS || align=right | 1.7 km || 
|-id=031 bgcolor=#E9E9E9
| 87031 ||  || — || May 6, 2000 || Socorro || LINEAR || — || align=right | 1.9 km || 
|-id=032 bgcolor=#fefefe
| 87032 ||  || — || May 5, 2000 || Socorro || LINEAR || — || align=right | 2.4 km || 
|-id=033 bgcolor=#fefefe
| 87033 || 2000 KK || — || May 24, 2000 || Prescott || P. G. Comba || — || align=right | 2.1 km || 
|-id=034 bgcolor=#fefefe
| 87034 ||  || — || May 26, 2000 || Prescott || P. G. Comba || — || align=right | 2.2 km || 
|-id=035 bgcolor=#FA8072
| 87035 ||  || — || May 26, 2000 || Socorro || LINEAR || — || align=right | 3.9 km || 
|-id=036 bgcolor=#fefefe
| 87036 ||  || — || May 27, 2000 || Socorro || LINEAR || — || align=right | 2.0 km || 
|-id=037 bgcolor=#fefefe
| 87037 ||  || — || May 27, 2000 || Reedy Creek || J. Broughton || MAS || align=right | 1.5 km || 
|-id=038 bgcolor=#fefefe
| 87038 ||  || — || May 27, 2000 || Socorro || LINEAR || PHO || align=right | 5.3 km || 
|-id=039 bgcolor=#E9E9E9
| 87039 ||  || — || May 27, 2000 || Socorro || LINEAR || — || align=right | 1.9 km || 
|-id=040 bgcolor=#fefefe
| 87040 ||  || — || May 27, 2000 || Socorro || LINEAR || NYS || align=right | 1.3 km || 
|-id=041 bgcolor=#fefefe
| 87041 ||  || — || May 27, 2000 || Socorro || LINEAR || FLO || align=right | 1.3 km || 
|-id=042 bgcolor=#fefefe
| 87042 ||  || — || May 27, 2000 || Socorro || LINEAR || — || align=right | 2.2 km || 
|-id=043 bgcolor=#fefefe
| 87043 ||  || — || May 27, 2000 || Socorro || LINEAR || NYS || align=right | 3.6 km || 
|-id=044 bgcolor=#E9E9E9
| 87044 ||  || — || May 27, 2000 || Socorro || LINEAR || — || align=right | 3.0 km || 
|-id=045 bgcolor=#fefefe
| 87045 ||  || — || May 28, 2000 || Socorro || LINEAR || — || align=right | 2.2 km || 
|-id=046 bgcolor=#fefefe
| 87046 ||  || — || May 28, 2000 || Socorro || LINEAR || V || align=right | 1.5 km || 
|-id=047 bgcolor=#fefefe
| 87047 ||  || — || May 28, 2000 || Socorro || LINEAR || NYS || align=right | 1.4 km || 
|-id=048 bgcolor=#E9E9E9
| 87048 ||  || — || May 28, 2000 || Socorro || LINEAR || — || align=right | 2.5 km || 
|-id=049 bgcolor=#fefefe
| 87049 ||  || — || May 28, 2000 || Socorro || LINEAR || NYS || align=right | 1.3 km || 
|-id=050 bgcolor=#fefefe
| 87050 ||  || — || May 28, 2000 || Socorro || LINEAR || NYS || align=right | 3.2 km || 
|-id=051 bgcolor=#fefefe
| 87051 ||  || — || May 28, 2000 || Socorro || LINEAR || — || align=right | 2.2 km || 
|-id=052 bgcolor=#E9E9E9
| 87052 ||  || — || May 28, 2000 || Socorro || LINEAR || — || align=right | 4.4 km || 
|-id=053 bgcolor=#E9E9E9
| 87053 ||  || — || May 28, 2000 || Socorro || LINEAR || EUN || align=right | 3.6 km || 
|-id=054 bgcolor=#E9E9E9
| 87054 ||  || — || May 28, 2000 || Socorro || LINEAR || — || align=right | 4.2 km || 
|-id=055 bgcolor=#fefefe
| 87055 ||  || — || May 28, 2000 || Socorro || LINEAR || MAS || align=right | 1.6 km || 
|-id=056 bgcolor=#fefefe
| 87056 ||  || — || May 27, 2000 || Socorro || LINEAR || — || align=right | 2.6 km || 
|-id=057 bgcolor=#E9E9E9
| 87057 ||  || — || May 27, 2000 || Socorro || LINEAR || — || align=right | 2.1 km || 
|-id=058 bgcolor=#E9E9E9
| 87058 ||  || — || May 27, 2000 || Socorro || LINEAR || — || align=right | 2.1 km || 
|-id=059 bgcolor=#fefefe
| 87059 ||  || — || May 29, 2000 || Socorro || LINEAR || — || align=right | 1.4 km || 
|-id=060 bgcolor=#E9E9E9
| 87060 ||  || — || May 24, 2000 || Kitt Peak || Spacewatch || — || align=right | 2.3 km || 
|-id=061 bgcolor=#d6d6d6
| 87061 ||  || — || May 30, 2000 || Kitt Peak || Spacewatch || — || align=right | 4.6 km || 
|-id=062 bgcolor=#fefefe
| 87062 ||  || — || May 28, 2000 || Socorro || LINEAR || NYS || align=right | 3.2 km || 
|-id=063 bgcolor=#E9E9E9
| 87063 ||  || — || May 29, 2000 || Socorro || LINEAR || — || align=right | 4.2 km || 
|-id=064 bgcolor=#E9E9E9
| 87064 ||  || — || May 27, 2000 || Socorro || LINEAR || — || align=right | 2.4 km || 
|-id=065 bgcolor=#fefefe
| 87065 ||  || — || May 27, 2000 || Socorro || LINEAR || — || align=right | 1.9 km || 
|-id=066 bgcolor=#E9E9E9
| 87066 ||  || — || May 27, 2000 || Socorro || LINEAR || — || align=right | 4.2 km || 
|-id=067 bgcolor=#E9E9E9
| 87067 ||  || — || May 28, 2000 || Socorro || LINEAR || — || align=right | 2.2 km || 
|-id=068 bgcolor=#fefefe
| 87068 ||  || — || May 24, 2000 || Anderson Mesa || LONEOS || — || align=right | 1.9 km || 
|-id=069 bgcolor=#fefefe
| 87069 ||  || — || May 24, 2000 || Kitt Peak || Spacewatch || V || align=right | 1.8 km || 
|-id=070 bgcolor=#E9E9E9
| 87070 ||  || — || May 25, 2000 || Anderson Mesa || LONEOS || EUN || align=right | 2.7 km || 
|-id=071 bgcolor=#E9E9E9
| 87071 ||  || — || May 25, 2000 || Anderson Mesa || LONEOS || — || align=right | 2.9 km || 
|-id=072 bgcolor=#E9E9E9
| 87072 ||  || — || May 26, 2000 || Anderson Mesa || LONEOS || — || align=right | 3.8 km || 
|-id=073 bgcolor=#E9E9E9
| 87073 ||  || — || May 27, 2000 || Socorro || LINEAR || — || align=right | 4.6 km || 
|-id=074 bgcolor=#fefefe
| 87074 ||  || — || May 30, 2000 || Socorro || LINEAR || V || align=right | 1.2 km || 
|-id=075 bgcolor=#E9E9E9
| 87075 ||  || — || May 28, 2000 || Socorro || LINEAR || — || align=right | 1.7 km || 
|-id=076 bgcolor=#E9E9E9
| 87076 ||  || — || May 28, 2000 || Anderson Mesa || LONEOS || — || align=right | 6.3 km || 
|-id=077 bgcolor=#fefefe
| 87077 ||  || — || May 27, 2000 || Socorro || LINEAR || ERI || align=right | 3.3 km || 
|-id=078 bgcolor=#fefefe
| 87078 ||  || — || May 27, 2000 || Socorro || LINEAR || V || align=right | 1.5 km || 
|-id=079 bgcolor=#E9E9E9
| 87079 ||  || — || May 27, 2000 || Socorro || LINEAR || MAR || align=right | 2.5 km || 
|-id=080 bgcolor=#fefefe
| 87080 ||  || — || May 27, 2000 || Socorro || LINEAR || — || align=right | 1.8 km || 
|-id=081 bgcolor=#E9E9E9
| 87081 ||  || — || May 27, 2000 || Socorro || LINEAR || — || align=right | 2.0 km || 
|-id=082 bgcolor=#fefefe
| 87082 ||  || — || May 27, 2000 || Socorro || LINEAR || — || align=right | 1.9 km || 
|-id=083 bgcolor=#fefefe
| 87083 ||  || — || May 27, 2000 || Socorro || LINEAR || V || align=right | 1.6 km || 
|-id=084 bgcolor=#E9E9E9
| 87084 ||  || — || May 27, 2000 || Socorro || LINEAR || MAR || align=right | 2.3 km || 
|-id=085 bgcolor=#fefefe
| 87085 ||  || — || May 27, 2000 || Socorro || LINEAR || — || align=right | 1.8 km || 
|-id=086 bgcolor=#fefefe
| 87086 ||  || — || May 24, 2000 || Anderson Mesa || LONEOS || — || align=right | 2.2 km || 
|-id=087 bgcolor=#fefefe
| 87087 ||  || — || May 25, 2000 || Anderson Mesa || LONEOS || — || align=right | 1.9 km || 
|-id=088 bgcolor=#fefefe
| 87088 Joannewheeler || 2000 LY ||  || June 2, 2000 || Ondřejov || P. Pravec, P. Kušnirák || ERI || align=right | 3.2 km || 
|-id=089 bgcolor=#fefefe
| 87089 ||  || — || June 1, 2000 || Črni Vrh || Črni Vrh || — || align=right | 4.4 km || 
|-id=090 bgcolor=#E9E9E9
| 87090 ||  || — || June 4, 2000 || Socorro || LINEAR || — || align=right | 7.1 km || 
|-id=091 bgcolor=#fefefe
| 87091 ||  || — || June 5, 2000 || Socorro || LINEAR || PHO || align=right | 2.8 km || 
|-id=092 bgcolor=#E9E9E9
| 87092 ||  || — || June 4, 2000 || Socorro || LINEAR || — || align=right | 5.2 km || 
|-id=093 bgcolor=#fefefe
| 87093 ||  || — || June 1, 2000 || Kitt Peak || Spacewatch || V || align=right | 2.1 km || 
|-id=094 bgcolor=#E9E9E9
| 87094 ||  || — || June 1, 2000 || Kitt Peak || Spacewatch || — || align=right | 2.2 km || 
|-id=095 bgcolor=#E9E9E9
| 87095 ||  || — || June 5, 2000 || Socorro || LINEAR || — || align=right | 3.5 km || 
|-id=096 bgcolor=#fefefe
| 87096 ||  || — || June 6, 2000 || Socorro || LINEAR || NYS || align=right | 1.9 km || 
|-id=097 bgcolor=#E9E9E9
| 87097 Lomaki ||  ||  || June 7, 2000 || Kleť || M. Tichý, J. Tichá || — || align=right | 2.6 km || 
|-id=098 bgcolor=#E9E9E9
| 87098 ||  || — || June 1, 2000 || Socorro || LINEAR || MIT || align=right | 6.1 km || 
|-id=099 bgcolor=#E9E9E9
| 87099 ||  || — || June 5, 2000 || Socorro || LINEAR || — || align=right | 2.7 km || 
|-id=100 bgcolor=#E9E9E9
| 87100 ||  || — || June 7, 2000 || Socorro || LINEAR || — || align=right | 3.8 km || 
|}

87101–87200 

|-bgcolor=#E9E9E9
| 87101 ||  || — || June 4, 2000 || Socorro || LINEAR || ADE || align=right | 6.9 km || 
|-id=102 bgcolor=#E9E9E9
| 87102 ||  || — || June 8, 2000 || Socorro || LINEAR || — || align=right | 3.7 km || 
|-id=103 bgcolor=#E9E9E9
| 87103 ||  || — || June 8, 2000 || Socorro || LINEAR || EUN || align=right | 2.9 km || 
|-id=104 bgcolor=#E9E9E9
| 87104 ||  || — || June 8, 2000 || Socorro || LINEAR || ADE || align=right | 5.4 km || 
|-id=105 bgcolor=#E9E9E9
| 87105 ||  || — || June 8, 2000 || Socorro || LINEAR || — || align=right | 5.8 km || 
|-id=106 bgcolor=#fefefe
| 87106 ||  || — || June 8, 2000 || Socorro || LINEAR || — || align=right | 1.9 km || 
|-id=107 bgcolor=#E9E9E9
| 87107 ||  || — || June 8, 2000 || Socorro || LINEAR || — || align=right | 3.0 km || 
|-id=108 bgcolor=#E9E9E9
| 87108 ||  || — || June 8, 2000 || Socorro || LINEAR || — || align=right | 7.0 km || 
|-id=109 bgcolor=#fefefe
| 87109 ||  || — || June 8, 2000 || Socorro || LINEAR || — || align=right | 5.2 km || 
|-id=110 bgcolor=#E9E9E9
| 87110 ||  || — || June 8, 2000 || Socorro || LINEAR || — || align=right | 6.4 km || 
|-id=111 bgcolor=#E9E9E9
| 87111 ||  || — || June 3, 2000 || Anderson Mesa || LONEOS || — || align=right | 2.7 km || 
|-id=112 bgcolor=#fefefe
| 87112 ||  || — || June 1, 2000 || Socorro || LINEAR || — || align=right | 3.6 km || 
|-id=113 bgcolor=#E9E9E9
| 87113 ||  || — || June 7, 2000 || Socorro || LINEAR || — || align=right | 3.7 km || 
|-id=114 bgcolor=#E9E9E9
| 87114 ||  || — || June 6, 2000 || Anderson Mesa || LONEOS || — || align=right | 6.2 km || 
|-id=115 bgcolor=#E9E9E9
| 87115 ||  || — || June 9, 2000 || Anderson Mesa || LONEOS || — || align=right | 2.7 km || 
|-id=116 bgcolor=#E9E9E9
| 87116 ||  || — || June 9, 2000 || Anderson Mesa || LONEOS || EUN || align=right | 3.9 km || 
|-id=117 bgcolor=#E9E9E9
| 87117 ||  || — || June 5, 2000 || Anderson Mesa || LONEOS || — || align=right | 6.1 km || 
|-id=118 bgcolor=#fefefe
| 87118 ||  || — || June 3, 2000 || Haleakala || NEAT || — || align=right | 1.9 km || 
|-id=119 bgcolor=#fefefe
| 87119 ||  || — || June 3, 2000 || Kitt Peak || Spacewatch || V || align=right | 1.1 km || 
|-id=120 bgcolor=#E9E9E9
| 87120 ||  || — || June 3, 2000 || Anderson Mesa || LONEOS || JUN || align=right | 3.1 km || 
|-id=121 bgcolor=#E9E9E9
| 87121 ||  || — || June 1, 2000 || Haleakala || NEAT || EUN || align=right | 2.1 km || 
|-id=122 bgcolor=#E9E9E9
| 87122 ||  || — || June 1, 2000 || Haleakala || NEAT || — || align=right | 2.5 km || 
|-id=123 bgcolor=#fefefe
| 87123 ||  || — || June 25, 2000 || Farpoint || Farpoint Obs. || — || align=right | 2.2 km || 
|-id=124 bgcolor=#E9E9E9
| 87124 ||  || — || June 26, 2000 || Reedy Creek || J. Broughton || — || align=right | 4.4 km || 
|-id=125 bgcolor=#fefefe
| 87125 ||  || — || June 25, 2000 || Prescott || P. G. Comba || V || align=right | 1.9 km || 
|-id=126 bgcolor=#fefefe
| 87126 ||  || — || June 24, 2000 || Socorro || LINEAR || NYS || align=right | 1.3 km || 
|-id=127 bgcolor=#E9E9E9
| 87127 ||  || — || June 25, 2000 || Socorro || LINEAR || — || align=right | 4.7 km || 
|-id=128 bgcolor=#E9E9E9
| 87128 ||  || — || June 25, 2000 || Socorro || LINEAR || — || align=right | 2.7 km || 
|-id=129 bgcolor=#E9E9E9
| 87129 ||  || — || June 26, 2000 || Socorro || LINEAR || EUN || align=right | 3.3 km || 
|-id=130 bgcolor=#E9E9E9
| 87130 || 2000 NE || — || July 1, 2000 || Prescott || P. G. Comba || — || align=right | 3.0 km || 
|-id=131 bgcolor=#E9E9E9
| 87131 ||  || — || July 4, 2000 || Kitt Peak || Spacewatch || — || align=right | 1.8 km || 
|-id=132 bgcolor=#fefefe
| 87132 ||  || — || July 3, 2000 || Kitt Peak || Spacewatch || — || align=right | 2.2 km || 
|-id=133 bgcolor=#fefefe
| 87133 ||  || — || July 7, 2000 || Socorro || LINEAR || — || align=right | 2.9 km || 
|-id=134 bgcolor=#E9E9E9
| 87134 ||  || — || July 8, 2000 || Socorro || LINEAR || slow || align=right | 4.6 km || 
|-id=135 bgcolor=#fefefe
| 87135 ||  || — || July 8, 2000 || Socorro || LINEAR || PHO || align=right | 5.1 km || 
|-id=136 bgcolor=#fefefe
| 87136 ||  || — || July 4, 2000 || Kitt Peak || Spacewatch || — || align=right | 1.7 km || 
|-id=137 bgcolor=#E9E9E9
| 87137 ||  || — || July 5, 2000 || Kitt Peak || Spacewatch || — || align=right | 2.0 km || 
|-id=138 bgcolor=#E9E9E9
| 87138 ||  || — || July 10, 2000 || Valinhos || P. R. Holvorcem || DOR || align=right | 7.6 km || 
|-id=139 bgcolor=#fefefe
| 87139 ||  || — || July 5, 2000 || Anderson Mesa || LONEOS || — || align=right | 3.4 km || 
|-id=140 bgcolor=#E9E9E9
| 87140 ||  || — || July 5, 2000 || Anderson Mesa || LONEOS || — || align=right | 2.1 km || 
|-id=141 bgcolor=#E9E9E9
| 87141 ||  || — || July 5, 2000 || Anderson Mesa || LONEOS || — || align=right | 2.6 km || 
|-id=142 bgcolor=#E9E9E9
| 87142 Delsanti ||  ||  || July 5, 2000 || Anderson Mesa || LONEOS || POS || align=right | 8.9 km || 
|-id=143 bgcolor=#E9E9E9
| 87143 ||  || — || July 5, 2000 || Anderson Mesa || LONEOS || — || align=right | 2.8 km || 
|-id=144 bgcolor=#E9E9E9
| 87144 ||  || — || July 5, 2000 || Anderson Mesa || LONEOS || — || align=right | 6.7 km || 
|-id=145 bgcolor=#E9E9E9
| 87145 ||  || — || July 5, 2000 || Anderson Mesa || LONEOS || — || align=right | 4.6 km || 
|-id=146 bgcolor=#E9E9E9
| 87146 ||  || — || July 5, 2000 || Anderson Mesa || LONEOS || RAF || align=right | 2.1 km || 
|-id=147 bgcolor=#E9E9E9
| 87147 ||  || — || July 5, 2000 || Anderson Mesa || LONEOS || — || align=right | 2.9 km || 
|-id=148 bgcolor=#E9E9E9
| 87148 ||  || — || July 5, 2000 || Anderson Mesa || LONEOS || — || align=right | 1.7 km || 
|-id=149 bgcolor=#fefefe
| 87149 ||  || — || July 5, 2000 || Anderson Mesa || LONEOS || NYS || align=right | 2.4 km || 
|-id=150 bgcolor=#E9E9E9
| 87150 ||  || — || July 5, 2000 || Anderson Mesa || LONEOS || — || align=right | 4.0 km || 
|-id=151 bgcolor=#d6d6d6
| 87151 ||  || — || July 5, 2000 || Anderson Mesa || LONEOS || — || align=right | 2.4 km || 
|-id=152 bgcolor=#E9E9E9
| 87152 ||  || — || July 6, 2000 || Kitt Peak || Spacewatch || — || align=right | 3.4 km || 
|-id=153 bgcolor=#fefefe
| 87153 ||  || — || July 6, 2000 || Kitt Peak || Spacewatch || NYS || align=right | 1.3 km || 
|-id=154 bgcolor=#E9E9E9
| 87154 ||  || — || July 6, 2000 || Anderson Mesa || LONEOS || — || align=right | 3.4 km || 
|-id=155 bgcolor=#E9E9E9
| 87155 ||  || — || July 7, 2000 || Anderson Mesa || LONEOS || — || align=right | 3.2 km || 
|-id=156 bgcolor=#E9E9E9
| 87156 ||  || — || July 7, 2000 || Socorro || LINEAR || — || align=right | 2.1 km || 
|-id=157 bgcolor=#E9E9E9
| 87157 ||  || — || July 7, 2000 || Anderson Mesa || LONEOS || — || align=right | 3.0 km || 
|-id=158 bgcolor=#E9E9E9
| 87158 ||  || — || July 7, 2000 || Anderson Mesa || LONEOS || — || align=right | 7.1 km || 
|-id=159 bgcolor=#fefefe
| 87159 ||  || — || July 5, 2000 || Kitt Peak || Spacewatch || — || align=right | 1.9 km || 
|-id=160 bgcolor=#E9E9E9
| 87160 ||  || — || July 4, 2000 || Anderson Mesa || LONEOS || DOR || align=right | 5.0 km || 
|-id=161 bgcolor=#fefefe
| 87161 ||  || — || July 4, 2000 || Anderson Mesa || LONEOS || EUT || align=right | 2.0 km || 
|-id=162 bgcolor=#E9E9E9
| 87162 ||  || — || July 4, 2000 || Anderson Mesa || LONEOS || — || align=right | 2.1 km || 
|-id=163 bgcolor=#E9E9E9
| 87163 ||  || — || July 4, 2000 || Anderson Mesa || LONEOS || GEF || align=right | 2.8 km || 
|-id=164 bgcolor=#fefefe
| 87164 ||  || — || July 4, 2000 || Anderson Mesa || LONEOS || MAS || align=right | 2.2 km || 
|-id=165 bgcolor=#d6d6d6
| 87165 ||  || — || July 4, 2000 || Anderson Mesa || LONEOS || — || align=right | 6.4 km || 
|-id=166 bgcolor=#E9E9E9
| 87166 ||  || — || July 3, 2000 || Socorro || LINEAR || EUN || align=right | 3.0 km || 
|-id=167 bgcolor=#fefefe
| 87167 ||  || — || July 2, 2000 || Kitt Peak || Spacewatch || V || align=right | 2.0 km || 
|-id=168 bgcolor=#E9E9E9
| 87168 || 2000 OW || — || July 24, 2000 || Reedy Creek || J. Broughton || BRG || align=right | 3.5 km || 
|-id=169 bgcolor=#E9E9E9
| 87169 ||  || — || July 27, 2000 || Črni Vrh || Črni Vrh || — || align=right | 4.1 km || 
|-id=170 bgcolor=#E9E9E9
| 87170 ||  || — || July 24, 2000 || Socorro || LINEAR || — || align=right | 5.6 km || 
|-id=171 bgcolor=#fefefe
| 87171 ||  || — || July 24, 2000 || Socorro || LINEAR || — || align=right | 2.4 km || 
|-id=172 bgcolor=#fefefe
| 87172 ||  || — || July 24, 2000 || Socorro || LINEAR || — || align=right | 3.5 km || 
|-id=173 bgcolor=#E9E9E9
| 87173 ||  || — || July 24, 2000 || Socorro || LINEAR || EUN || align=right | 3.3 km || 
|-id=174 bgcolor=#fefefe
| 87174 ||  || — || July 24, 2000 || Socorro || LINEAR || — || align=right | 2.6 km || 
|-id=175 bgcolor=#E9E9E9
| 87175 ||  || — || July 24, 2000 || Socorro || LINEAR || — || align=right | 3.0 km || 
|-id=176 bgcolor=#E9E9E9
| 87176 ||  || — || July 24, 2000 || Socorro || LINEAR || EUN || align=right | 4.3 km || 
|-id=177 bgcolor=#fefefe
| 87177 ||  || — || July 29, 2000 || Socorro || LINEAR || V || align=right | 2.0 km || 
|-id=178 bgcolor=#E9E9E9
| 87178 ||  || — || July 28, 2000 || Črni Vrh || Črni Vrh || EUN || align=right | 3.1 km || 
|-id=179 bgcolor=#E9E9E9
| 87179 ||  || — || July 30, 2000 || Socorro || LINEAR || — || align=right | 7.5 km || 
|-id=180 bgcolor=#E9E9E9
| 87180 ||  || — || July 24, 2000 || Socorro || LINEAR || — || align=right | 4.1 km || 
|-id=181 bgcolor=#E9E9E9
| 87181 ||  || — || July 30, 2000 || Socorro || LINEAR || — || align=right | 2.9 km || 
|-id=182 bgcolor=#E9E9E9
| 87182 ||  || — || July 31, 2000 || Socorro || LINEAR || — || align=right | 3.5 km || 
|-id=183 bgcolor=#fefefe
| 87183 ||  || — || July 23, 2000 || Socorro || LINEAR || ERI || align=right | 5.4 km || 
|-id=184 bgcolor=#E9E9E9
| 87184 ||  || — || July 23, 2000 || Socorro || LINEAR || — || align=right | 2.1 km || 
|-id=185 bgcolor=#fefefe
| 87185 ||  || — || July 23, 2000 || Socorro || LINEAR || NYS || align=right | 4.6 km || 
|-id=186 bgcolor=#E9E9E9
| 87186 ||  || — || July 23, 2000 || Socorro || LINEAR || — || align=right | 4.4 km || 
|-id=187 bgcolor=#E9E9E9
| 87187 ||  || — || July 23, 2000 || Socorro || LINEAR || — || align=right | 2.0 km || 
|-id=188 bgcolor=#E9E9E9
| 87188 ||  || — || July 23, 2000 || Socorro || LINEAR || NEM || align=right | 5.8 km || 
|-id=189 bgcolor=#fefefe
| 87189 ||  || — || July 23, 2000 || Socorro || LINEAR || NYS || align=right | 1.2 km || 
|-id=190 bgcolor=#E9E9E9
| 87190 ||  || — || July 23, 2000 || Socorro || LINEAR || — || align=right | 3.1 km || 
|-id=191 bgcolor=#E9E9E9
| 87191 ||  || — || July 23, 2000 || Socorro || LINEAR || — || align=right | 5.3 km || 
|-id=192 bgcolor=#fefefe
| 87192 ||  || — || July 23, 2000 || Socorro || LINEAR || NYS || align=right | 1.9 km || 
|-id=193 bgcolor=#E9E9E9
| 87193 ||  || — || July 23, 2000 || Socorro || LINEAR || — || align=right | 5.6 km || 
|-id=194 bgcolor=#E9E9E9
| 87194 ||  || — || July 23, 2000 || Socorro || LINEAR || — || align=right | 2.3 km || 
|-id=195 bgcolor=#fefefe
| 87195 ||  || — || July 23, 2000 || Socorro || LINEAR || — || align=right | 2.3 km || 
|-id=196 bgcolor=#E9E9E9
| 87196 ||  || — || July 30, 2000 || Socorro || LINEAR || — || align=right | 2.5 km || 
|-id=197 bgcolor=#fefefe
| 87197 ||  || — || July 30, 2000 || Socorro || LINEAR || PHO || align=right | 2.3 km || 
|-id=198 bgcolor=#E9E9E9
| 87198 ||  || — || July 31, 2000 || Socorro || LINEAR || — || align=right | 3.5 km || 
|-id=199 bgcolor=#fefefe
| 87199 ||  || — || July 23, 2000 || Socorro || LINEAR || NYS || align=right | 1.8 km || 
|-id=200 bgcolor=#E9E9E9
| 87200 ||  || — || July 23, 2000 || Socorro || LINEAR || — || align=right | 2.5 km || 
|}

87201–87300 

|-bgcolor=#fefefe
| 87201 ||  || — || July 23, 2000 || Socorro || LINEAR || — || align=right | 2.5 km || 
|-id=202 bgcolor=#fefefe
| 87202 ||  || — || July 23, 2000 || Socorro || LINEAR || — || align=right | 2.9 km || 
|-id=203 bgcolor=#fefefe
| 87203 ||  || — || July 23, 2000 || Socorro || LINEAR || MAS || align=right | 2.2 km || 
|-id=204 bgcolor=#fefefe
| 87204 ||  || — || July 30, 2000 || Socorro || LINEAR || — || align=right | 2.6 km || 
|-id=205 bgcolor=#fefefe
| 87205 ||  || — || July 30, 2000 || Socorro || LINEAR || — || align=right | 3.2 km || 
|-id=206 bgcolor=#E9E9E9
| 87206 ||  || — || July 30, 2000 || Socorro || LINEAR || EUN || align=right | 4.0 km || 
|-id=207 bgcolor=#E9E9E9
| 87207 ||  || — || July 30, 2000 || Socorro || LINEAR || — || align=right | 4.8 km || 
|-id=208 bgcolor=#E9E9E9
| 87208 ||  || — || July 30, 2000 || Socorro || LINEAR || — || align=right | 2.1 km || 
|-id=209 bgcolor=#E9E9E9
| 87209 ||  || — || July 30, 2000 || Socorro || LINEAR || — || align=right | 2.2 km || 
|-id=210 bgcolor=#fefefe
| 87210 ||  || — || July 31, 2000 || Socorro || LINEAR || — || align=right | 3.7 km || 
|-id=211 bgcolor=#E9E9E9
| 87211 ||  || — || July 30, 2000 || Socorro || LINEAR || — || align=right | 5.1 km || 
|-id=212 bgcolor=#E9E9E9
| 87212 ||  || — || July 30, 2000 || Socorro || LINEAR || — || align=right | 2.2 km || 
|-id=213 bgcolor=#d6d6d6
| 87213 ||  || — || July 30, 2000 || Socorro || LINEAR || — || align=right | 4.3 km || 
|-id=214 bgcolor=#E9E9E9
| 87214 ||  || — || July 30, 2000 || Socorro || LINEAR || — || align=right | 2.1 km || 
|-id=215 bgcolor=#E9E9E9
| 87215 ||  || — || July 30, 2000 || Socorro || LINEAR || — || align=right | 6.1 km || 
|-id=216 bgcolor=#d6d6d6
| 87216 ||  || — || July 30, 2000 || Socorro || LINEAR || — || align=right | 3.3 km || 
|-id=217 bgcolor=#E9E9E9
| 87217 ||  || — || July 30, 2000 || Socorro || LINEAR || — || align=right | 5.2 km || 
|-id=218 bgcolor=#E9E9E9
| 87218 ||  || — || July 30, 2000 || Socorro || LINEAR || — || align=right | 2.7 km || 
|-id=219 bgcolor=#E9E9E9
| 87219 Marcbernstein ||  ||  || July 30, 2000 || Socorro || LINEAR || — || align=right | 2.3 km || 
|-id=220 bgcolor=#E9E9E9
| 87220 ||  || — || July 30, 2000 || Socorro || LINEAR || EUN || align=right | 2.4 km || 
|-id=221 bgcolor=#E9E9E9
| 87221 ||  || — || July 30, 2000 || Socorro || LINEAR || — || align=right | 2.1 km || 
|-id=222 bgcolor=#d6d6d6
| 87222 ||  || — || July 30, 2000 || Socorro || LINEAR || HYG || align=right | 7.1 km || 
|-id=223 bgcolor=#fefefe
| 87223 ||  || — || July 30, 2000 || Socorro || LINEAR || V || align=right | 2.8 km || 
|-id=224 bgcolor=#E9E9E9
| 87224 ||  || — || July 30, 2000 || Socorro || LINEAR || MIT || align=right | 7.1 km || 
|-id=225 bgcolor=#d6d6d6
| 87225 ||  || — || July 30, 2000 || Socorro || LINEAR || — || align=right | 3.6 km || 
|-id=226 bgcolor=#E9E9E9
| 87226 ||  || — || July 30, 2000 || Socorro || LINEAR || — || align=right | 2.1 km || 
|-id=227 bgcolor=#E9E9E9
| 87227 ||  || — || July 30, 2000 || Socorro || LINEAR || — || align=right | 3.7 km || 
|-id=228 bgcolor=#d6d6d6
| 87228 ||  || — || July 30, 2000 || Socorro || LINEAR || — || align=right | 7.1 km || 
|-id=229 bgcolor=#E9E9E9
| 87229 ||  || — || July 30, 2000 || Socorro || LINEAR || — || align=right | 2.9 km || 
|-id=230 bgcolor=#E9E9E9
| 87230 ||  || — || July 30, 2000 || Socorro || LINEAR || — || align=right | 2.2 km || 
|-id=231 bgcolor=#E9E9E9
| 87231 ||  || — || July 30, 2000 || Socorro || LINEAR || EUNslow || align=right | 2.7 km || 
|-id=232 bgcolor=#fefefe
| 87232 ||  || — || July 30, 2000 || Socorro || LINEAR || — || align=right | 2.0 km || 
|-id=233 bgcolor=#E9E9E9
| 87233 ||  || — || July 30, 2000 || Socorro || LINEAR || — || align=right | 7.6 km || 
|-id=234 bgcolor=#E9E9E9
| 87234 ||  || — || July 30, 2000 || Socorro || LINEAR || — || align=right | 3.2 km || 
|-id=235 bgcolor=#E9E9E9
| 87235 ||  || — || July 30, 2000 || Socorro || LINEAR || EUN || align=right | 6.4 km || 
|-id=236 bgcolor=#E9E9E9
| 87236 ||  || — || July 30, 2000 || Socorro || LINEAR || — || align=right | 2.2 km || 
|-id=237 bgcolor=#E9E9E9
| 87237 ||  || — || July 30, 2000 || Socorro || LINEAR || — || align=right | 5.6 km || 
|-id=238 bgcolor=#E9E9E9
| 87238 ||  || — || July 30, 2000 || Socorro || LINEAR || — || align=right | 2.9 km || 
|-id=239 bgcolor=#E9E9E9
| 87239 ||  || — || July 30, 2000 || Socorro || LINEAR || IAN || align=right | 3.1 km || 
|-id=240 bgcolor=#E9E9E9
| 87240 ||  || — || July 30, 2000 || Socorro || LINEAR || JUN || align=right | 3.4 km || 
|-id=241 bgcolor=#E9E9E9
| 87241 ||  || — || July 30, 2000 || Socorro || LINEAR || — || align=right | 5.3 km || 
|-id=242 bgcolor=#d6d6d6
| 87242 ||  || — || July 30, 2000 || Socorro || LINEAR || HYG || align=right | 6.1 km || 
|-id=243 bgcolor=#E9E9E9
| 87243 ||  || — || July 30, 2000 || Socorro || LINEAR || — || align=right | 2.6 km || 
|-id=244 bgcolor=#E9E9E9
| 87244 ||  || — || July 31, 2000 || Socorro || LINEAR || JUN || align=right | 6.5 km || 
|-id=245 bgcolor=#E9E9E9
| 87245 ||  || — || July 31, 2000 || Socorro || LINEAR || — || align=right | 4.4 km || 
|-id=246 bgcolor=#fefefe
| 87246 ||  || — || July 31, 2000 || Socorro || LINEAR || — || align=right | 4.4 km || 
|-id=247 bgcolor=#E9E9E9
| 87247 ||  || — || July 31, 2000 || Socorro || LINEAR || — || align=right | 2.0 km || 
|-id=248 bgcolor=#E9E9E9
| 87248 ||  || — || July 31, 2000 || Socorro || LINEAR || MAR || align=right | 4.2 km || 
|-id=249 bgcolor=#E9E9E9
| 87249 ||  || — || July 31, 2000 || Socorro || LINEAR || — || align=right | 3.4 km || 
|-id=250 bgcolor=#E9E9E9
| 87250 ||  || — || July 31, 2000 || Socorro || LINEAR || — || align=right | 2.9 km || 
|-id=251 bgcolor=#E9E9E9
| 87251 ||  || — || July 31, 2000 || Socorro || LINEAR || — || align=right | 3.6 km || 
|-id=252 bgcolor=#E9E9E9
| 87252 ||  || — || July 31, 2000 || Socorro || LINEAR || — || align=right | 5.4 km || 
|-id=253 bgcolor=#E9E9E9
| 87253 ||  || — || July 31, 2000 || Socorro || LINEAR || — || align=right | 2.4 km || 
|-id=254 bgcolor=#E9E9E9
| 87254 ||  || — || July 31, 2000 || Socorro || LINEAR || — || align=right | 2.8 km || 
|-id=255 bgcolor=#d6d6d6
| 87255 ||  || — || July 30, 2000 || Socorro || LINEAR || — || align=right | 5.8 km || 
|-id=256 bgcolor=#E9E9E9
| 87256 ||  || — || July 30, 2000 || Socorro || LINEAR || EUN || align=right | 3.2 km || 
|-id=257 bgcolor=#E9E9E9
| 87257 ||  || — || July 30, 2000 || Socorro || LINEAR || EUN || align=right | 4.2 km || 
|-id=258 bgcolor=#E9E9E9
| 87258 ||  || — || July 30, 2000 || Socorro || LINEAR || MAR || align=right | 3.7 km || 
|-id=259 bgcolor=#E9E9E9
| 87259 ||  || — || July 30, 2000 || Socorro || LINEAR || — || align=right | 4.6 km || 
|-id=260 bgcolor=#E9E9E9
| 87260 ||  || — || July 29, 2000 || Anderson Mesa || LONEOS || — || align=right | 1.9 km || 
|-id=261 bgcolor=#E9E9E9
| 87261 ||  || — || July 29, 2000 || Anderson Mesa || LONEOS || — || align=right | 2.1 km || 
|-id=262 bgcolor=#E9E9E9
| 87262 ||  || — || July 29, 2000 || Anderson Mesa || LONEOS || — || align=right | 2.5 km || 
|-id=263 bgcolor=#E9E9E9
| 87263 ||  || — || July 29, 2000 || Anderson Mesa || LONEOS || — || align=right | 2.2 km || 
|-id=264 bgcolor=#fefefe
| 87264 ||  || — || July 29, 2000 || Anderson Mesa || LONEOS || V || align=right | 1.6 km || 
|-id=265 bgcolor=#fefefe
| 87265 ||  || — || July 29, 2000 || Anderson Mesa || LONEOS || — || align=right | 3.1 km || 
|-id=266 bgcolor=#E9E9E9
| 87266 ||  || — || July 29, 2000 || Anderson Mesa || LONEOS || — || align=right | 1.2 km || 
|-id=267 bgcolor=#E9E9E9
| 87267 ||  || — || July 29, 2000 || Anderson Mesa || LONEOS || — || align=right | 1.8 km || 
|-id=268 bgcolor=#E9E9E9
| 87268 ||  || — || July 29, 2000 || Anderson Mesa || LONEOS || — || align=right | 2.0 km || 
|-id=269 bgcolor=#C2E0FF
| 87269 ||  || — || July 29, 2000 || Cerro Tololo || Cerro Tololo Obs. || centaur || align=right | 64 km || 
|-id=270 bgcolor=#d6d6d6
| 87270 ||  || — || July 31, 2000 || Cerro Tololo || M. W. Buie || TEL || align=right | 3.4 km || 
|-id=271 bgcolor=#E9E9E9
| 87271 Kokubunji ||  ||  || August 3, 2000 || Bisei SG Center || BATTeRS || — || align=right | 5.0 km || 
|-id=272 bgcolor=#E9E9E9
| 87272 ||  || — || August 1, 2000 || Socorro || LINEAR || — || align=right | 3.4 km || 
|-id=273 bgcolor=#E9E9E9
| 87273 ||  || — || August 2, 2000 || Socorro || LINEAR || — || align=right | 2.6 km || 
|-id=274 bgcolor=#E9E9E9
| 87274 ||  || — || August 3, 2000 || Socorro || LINEAR || — || align=right | 3.5 km || 
|-id=275 bgcolor=#fefefe
| 87275 ||  || — || August 4, 2000 || Siding Spring || R. H. McNaught || — || align=right | 2.9 km || 
|-id=276 bgcolor=#d6d6d6
| 87276 ||  || — || August 6, 2000 || Siding Spring || R. H. McNaught || — || align=right | 8.7 km || 
|-id=277 bgcolor=#E9E9E9
| 87277 ||  || — || August 1, 2000 || Socorro || LINEAR || EUN || align=right | 2.5 km || 
|-id=278 bgcolor=#E9E9E9
| 87278 ||  || — || August 1, 2000 || Socorro || LINEAR || — || align=right | 6.5 km || 
|-id=279 bgcolor=#E9E9E9
| 87279 ||  || — || August 1, 2000 || Socorro || LINEAR || — || align=right | 2.8 km || 
|-id=280 bgcolor=#E9E9E9
| 87280 ||  || — || August 1, 2000 || Socorro || LINEAR || MIT || align=right | 5.7 km || 
|-id=281 bgcolor=#E9E9E9
| 87281 ||  || — || August 8, 2000 || Socorro || LINEAR || — || align=right | 4.1 km || 
|-id=282 bgcolor=#d6d6d6
| 87282 ||  || — || August 8, 2000 || Socorro || LINEAR || — || align=right | 8.9 km || 
|-id=283 bgcolor=#E9E9E9
| 87283 ||  || — || August 8, 2000 || Socorro || LINEAR || — || align=right | 5.8 km || 
|-id=284 bgcolor=#E9E9E9
| 87284 ||  || — || August 1, 2000 || Socorro || LINEAR || — || align=right | 2.9 km || 
|-id=285 bgcolor=#E9E9E9
| 87285 ||  || — || August 1, 2000 || Socorro || LINEAR || — || align=right | 4.6 km || 
|-id=286 bgcolor=#fefefe
| 87286 ||  || — || August 1, 2000 || Socorro || LINEAR || — || align=right | 2.0 km || 
|-id=287 bgcolor=#fefefe
| 87287 ||  || — || August 1, 2000 || Socorro || LINEAR || — || align=right | 1.9 km || 
|-id=288 bgcolor=#fefefe
| 87288 ||  || — || August 1, 2000 || Socorro || LINEAR || NYS || align=right | 1.5 km || 
|-id=289 bgcolor=#d6d6d6
| 87289 ||  || — || August 1, 2000 || Socorro || LINEAR || K-2 || align=right | 3.6 km || 
|-id=290 bgcolor=#E9E9E9
| 87290 ||  || — || August 1, 2000 || Socorro || LINEAR || — || align=right | 2.6 km || 
|-id=291 bgcolor=#d6d6d6
| 87291 ||  || — || August 1, 2000 || Socorro || LINEAR || — || align=right | 4.3 km || 
|-id=292 bgcolor=#fefefe
| 87292 ||  || — || August 1, 2000 || Socorro || LINEAR || — || align=right | 4.6 km || 
|-id=293 bgcolor=#E9E9E9
| 87293 ||  || — || August 1, 2000 || Socorro || LINEAR || — || align=right | 2.2 km || 
|-id=294 bgcolor=#E9E9E9
| 87294 ||  || — || August 1, 2000 || Socorro || LINEAR || — || align=right | 2.4 km || 
|-id=295 bgcolor=#E9E9E9
| 87295 ||  || — || August 1, 2000 || Socorro || LINEAR || — || align=right | 2.2 km || 
|-id=296 bgcolor=#d6d6d6
| 87296 ||  || — || August 2, 2000 || Socorro || LINEAR || KOR || align=right | 2.8 km || 
|-id=297 bgcolor=#E9E9E9
| 87297 ||  || — || August 2, 2000 || Socorro || LINEAR || — || align=right | 3.4 km || 
|-id=298 bgcolor=#E9E9E9
| 87298 ||  || — || August 2, 2000 || Socorro || LINEAR || — || align=right | 1.6 km || 
|-id=299 bgcolor=#d6d6d6
| 87299 ||  || — || August 3, 2000 || Socorro || LINEAR || — || align=right | 12 km || 
|-id=300 bgcolor=#E9E9E9
| 87300 ||  || — || August 3, 2000 || Socorro || LINEAR || — || align=right | 2.1 km || 
|}

87301–87400 

|-bgcolor=#E9E9E9
| 87301 ||  || — || August 4, 2000 || Socorro || LINEAR || — || align=right | 3.6 km || 
|-id=302 bgcolor=#E9E9E9
| 87302 ||  || — || August 4, 2000 || Socorro || LINEAR || — || align=right | 5.5 km || 
|-id=303 bgcolor=#d6d6d6
| 87303 ||  || — || August 5, 2000 || Haleakala || NEAT || — || align=right | 11 km || 
|-id=304 bgcolor=#fefefe
| 87304 ||  || — || August 9, 2000 || Socorro || LINEAR || — || align=right | 2.3 km || 
|-id=305 bgcolor=#E9E9E9
| 87305 ||  || — || August 9, 2000 || Socorro || LINEAR || — || align=right | 6.1 km || 
|-id=306 bgcolor=#E9E9E9
| 87306 ||  || — || August 10, 2000 || Socorro || LINEAR || PAL || align=right | 7.5 km || 
|-id=307 bgcolor=#fefefe
| 87307 ||  || — || August 7, 2000 || Bisei SG Center || BATTeRS || KLI || align=right | 5.2 km || 
|-id=308 bgcolor=#E9E9E9
| 87308 ||  || — || August 2, 2000 || Socorro || LINEAR || — || align=right | 3.1 km || 
|-id=309 bgcolor=#FFC2E0
| 87309 || 2000 QP || — || August 21, 2000 || Socorro || LINEAR || ATE +1kmfast || align=right data-sort-value="0.57" | 570 m || 
|-id=310 bgcolor=#E9E9E9
| 87310 ||  || — || August 23, 2000 || Reedy Creek || J. Broughton || — || align=right | 2.3 km || 
|-id=311 bgcolor=#FFC2E0
| 87311 ||  || — || August 21, 2000 || Anderson Mesa || LONEOS || APO +1km || align=right | 1.9 km || 
|-id=312 bgcolor=#E9E9E9
| 87312 Akirasuzuki ||  ||  || August 23, 2000 || Bisei SG Center || BATTeRS || EUN || align=right | 5.8 km || 
|-id=313 bgcolor=#E9E9E9
| 87313 ||  || — || August 24, 2000 || Socorro || LINEAR || — || align=right | 2.5 km || 
|-id=314 bgcolor=#fefefe
| 87314 ||  || — || August 24, 2000 || Socorro || LINEAR || — || align=right | 2.3 km || 
|-id=315 bgcolor=#E9E9E9
| 87315 ||  || — || August 24, 2000 || Socorro || LINEAR || — || align=right | 2.3 km || 
|-id=316 bgcolor=#E9E9E9
| 87316 ||  || — || August 24, 2000 || Socorro || LINEAR || — || align=right | 4.4 km || 
|-id=317 bgcolor=#E9E9E9
| 87317 ||  || — || August 24, 2000 || Socorro || LINEAR || — || align=right | 2.1 km || 
|-id=318 bgcolor=#E9E9E9
| 87318 ||  || — || August 24, 2000 || Črni Vrh || Črni Vrh || — || align=right | 7.2 km || 
|-id=319 bgcolor=#E9E9E9
| 87319 ||  || — || August 25, 2000 || Črni Vrh || Črni Vrh || — || align=right | 3.4 km || 
|-id=320 bgcolor=#d6d6d6
| 87320 ||  || — || August 24, 2000 || Socorro || LINEAR || — || align=right | 6.5 km || 
|-id=321 bgcolor=#E9E9E9
| 87321 ||  || — || August 24, 2000 || Socorro || LINEAR || — || align=right | 3.2 km || 
|-id=322 bgcolor=#E9E9E9
| 87322 ||  || — || August 24, 2000 || Socorro || LINEAR || — || align=right | 2.5 km || 
|-id=323 bgcolor=#fefefe
| 87323 ||  || — || August 24, 2000 || Socorro || LINEAR || — || align=right | 2.6 km || 
|-id=324 bgcolor=#fefefe
| 87324 ||  || — || August 24, 2000 || Socorro || LINEAR || — || align=right | 3.5 km || 
|-id=325 bgcolor=#E9E9E9
| 87325 ||  || — || August 24, 2000 || Socorro || LINEAR || RAF || align=right | 1.8 km || 
|-id=326 bgcolor=#E9E9E9
| 87326 ||  || — || August 24, 2000 || Socorro || LINEAR || — || align=right | 1.8 km || 
|-id=327 bgcolor=#E9E9E9
| 87327 ||  || — || August 24, 2000 || Socorro || LINEAR || — || align=right | 2.0 km || 
|-id=328 bgcolor=#fefefe
| 87328 ||  || — || August 24, 2000 || Socorro || LINEAR || — || align=right | 2.0 km || 
|-id=329 bgcolor=#d6d6d6
| 87329 ||  || — || August 24, 2000 || Socorro || LINEAR || KOR || align=right | 2.7 km || 
|-id=330 bgcolor=#E9E9E9
| 87330 ||  || — || August 24, 2000 || Socorro || LINEAR || — || align=right | 1.9 km || 
|-id=331 bgcolor=#E9E9E9
| 87331 ||  || — || August 24, 2000 || Socorro || LINEAR || — || align=right | 1.9 km || 
|-id=332 bgcolor=#d6d6d6
| 87332 ||  || — || August 24, 2000 || Socorro || LINEAR || — || align=right | 4.5 km || 
|-id=333 bgcolor=#d6d6d6
| 87333 ||  || — || August 24, 2000 || Socorro || LINEAR || — || align=right | 6.4 km || 
|-id=334 bgcolor=#E9E9E9
| 87334 ||  || — || August 24, 2000 || Socorro || LINEAR || — || align=right | 2.8 km || 
|-id=335 bgcolor=#E9E9E9
| 87335 ||  || — || August 24, 2000 || Socorro || LINEAR || MIT || align=right | 5.2 km || 
|-id=336 bgcolor=#d6d6d6
| 87336 ||  || — || August 24, 2000 || Socorro || LINEAR || — || align=right | 4.5 km || 
|-id=337 bgcolor=#E9E9E9
| 87337 ||  || — || August 24, 2000 || Socorro || LINEAR || — || align=right | 2.6 km || 
|-id=338 bgcolor=#E9E9E9
| 87338 ||  || — || August 25, 2000 || Socorro || LINEAR || — || align=right | 3.5 km || 
|-id=339 bgcolor=#E9E9E9
| 87339 ||  || — || August 25, 2000 || Socorro || LINEAR || — || align=right | 3.4 km || 
|-id=340 bgcolor=#E9E9E9
| 87340 ||  || — || August 25, 2000 || Socorro || LINEAR || — || align=right | 4.3 km || 
|-id=341 bgcolor=#fefefe
| 87341 ||  || — || August 25, 2000 || Socorro || LINEAR || — || align=right | 2.4 km || 
|-id=342 bgcolor=#E9E9E9
| 87342 ||  || — || August 25, 2000 || Socorro || LINEAR || — || align=right | 2.1 km || 
|-id=343 bgcolor=#fefefe
| 87343 ||  || — || August 25, 2000 || Socorro || LINEAR || H || align=right | 1.7 km || 
|-id=344 bgcolor=#E9E9E9
| 87344 ||  || — || August 26, 2000 || Socorro || LINEAR || BRU || align=right | 5.8 km || 
|-id=345 bgcolor=#E9E9E9
| 87345 ||  || — || August 26, 2000 || Socorro || LINEAR || BRU || align=right | 7.9 km || 
|-id=346 bgcolor=#E9E9E9
| 87346 ||  || — || August 24, 2000 || Socorro || LINEAR || MAR || align=right | 2.3 km || 
|-id=347 bgcolor=#E9E9E9
| 87347 ||  || — || August 24, 2000 || Socorro || LINEAR || EUN || align=right | 3.3 km || 
|-id=348 bgcolor=#d6d6d6
| 87348 ||  || — || August 24, 2000 || Socorro || LINEAR || — || align=right | 6.0 km || 
|-id=349 bgcolor=#d6d6d6
| 87349 ||  || — || August 25, 2000 || Socorro || LINEAR || — || align=right | 5.5 km || 
|-id=350 bgcolor=#fefefe
| 87350 ||  || — || August 25, 2000 || Socorro || LINEAR || — || align=right | 2.8 km || 
|-id=351 bgcolor=#E9E9E9
| 87351 ||  || — || August 26, 2000 || Socorro || LINEAR || — || align=right | 2.7 km || 
|-id=352 bgcolor=#E9E9E9
| 87352 ||  || — || August 26, 2000 || Socorro || LINEAR || — || align=right | 2.9 km || 
|-id=353 bgcolor=#E9E9E9
| 87353 ||  || — || August 26, 2000 || Socorro || LINEAR || EUN || align=right | 2.7 km || 
|-id=354 bgcolor=#E9E9E9
| 87354 ||  || — || August 26, 2000 || Socorro || LINEAR || — || align=right | 4.7 km || 
|-id=355 bgcolor=#E9E9E9
| 87355 ||  || — || August 24, 2000 || Socorro || LINEAR || — || align=right | 3.6 km || 
|-id=356 bgcolor=#d6d6d6
| 87356 ||  || — || August 24, 2000 || Socorro || LINEAR || — || align=right | 6.2 km || 
|-id=357 bgcolor=#fefefe
| 87357 ||  || — || August 24, 2000 || Socorro || LINEAR || NYS || align=right | 1.7 km || 
|-id=358 bgcolor=#E9E9E9
| 87358 ||  || — || August 24, 2000 || Socorro || LINEAR || — || align=right | 2.5 km || 
|-id=359 bgcolor=#E9E9E9
| 87359 ||  || — || August 24, 2000 || Socorro || LINEAR || — || align=right | 2.0 km || 
|-id=360 bgcolor=#E9E9E9
| 87360 ||  || — || August 24, 2000 || Socorro || LINEAR || MAR || align=right | 3.4 km || 
|-id=361 bgcolor=#d6d6d6
| 87361 ||  || — || August 24, 2000 || Socorro || LINEAR || KOR || align=right | 2.6 km || 
|-id=362 bgcolor=#d6d6d6
| 87362 ||  || — || August 24, 2000 || Socorro || LINEAR || — || align=right | 9.0 km || 
|-id=363 bgcolor=#E9E9E9
| 87363 ||  || — || August 24, 2000 || Socorro || LINEAR || HEN || align=right | 2.2 km || 
|-id=364 bgcolor=#d6d6d6
| 87364 ||  || — || August 24, 2000 || Socorro || LINEAR || KOR || align=right | 2.6 km || 
|-id=365 bgcolor=#fefefe
| 87365 ||  || — || August 24, 2000 || Socorro || LINEAR || MAS || align=right | 1.8 km || 
|-id=366 bgcolor=#E9E9E9
| 87366 ||  || — || August 24, 2000 || Socorro || LINEAR || — || align=right | 1.4 km || 
|-id=367 bgcolor=#fefefe
| 87367 ||  || — || August 24, 2000 || Socorro || LINEAR || — || align=right | 1.6 km || 
|-id=368 bgcolor=#E9E9E9
| 87368 ||  || — || August 24, 2000 || Socorro || LINEAR || — || align=right | 3.1 km || 
|-id=369 bgcolor=#E9E9E9
| 87369 ||  || — || August 24, 2000 || Socorro || LINEAR || — || align=right | 1.9 km || 
|-id=370 bgcolor=#E9E9E9
| 87370 ||  || — || August 24, 2000 || Socorro || LINEAR || EUN || align=right | 3.1 km || 
|-id=371 bgcolor=#E9E9E9
| 87371 ||  || — || August 24, 2000 || Socorro || LINEAR || — || align=right | 1.9 km || 
|-id=372 bgcolor=#fefefe
| 87372 ||  || — || August 25, 2000 || Socorro || LINEAR || MAS || align=right | 2.3 km || 
|-id=373 bgcolor=#E9E9E9
| 87373 ||  || — || August 25, 2000 || Socorro || LINEAR || — || align=right | 2.1 km || 
|-id=374 bgcolor=#E9E9E9
| 87374 ||  || — || August 25, 2000 || Socorro || LINEAR || XIZ || align=right | 3.5 km || 
|-id=375 bgcolor=#d6d6d6
| 87375 ||  || — || August 25, 2000 || Socorro || LINEAR || 7:4 || align=right | 10 km || 
|-id=376 bgcolor=#fefefe
| 87376 ||  || — || August 26, 2000 || Socorro || LINEAR || — || align=right | 4.0 km || 
|-id=377 bgcolor=#E9E9E9
| 87377 ||  || — || August 26, 2000 || Socorro || LINEAR || — || align=right | 2.9 km || 
|-id=378 bgcolor=#fefefe
| 87378 ||  || — || August 26, 2000 || Socorro || LINEAR || — || align=right | 1.8 km || 
|-id=379 bgcolor=#d6d6d6
| 87379 ||  || — || August 26, 2000 || Socorro || LINEAR || — || align=right | 4.5 km || 
|-id=380 bgcolor=#E9E9E9
| 87380 ||  || — || August 26, 2000 || Socorro || LINEAR || — || align=right | 5.7 km || 
|-id=381 bgcolor=#E9E9E9
| 87381 ||  || — || August 28, 2000 || Socorro || LINEAR || RAF || align=right | 1.9 km || 
|-id=382 bgcolor=#E9E9E9
| 87382 ||  || — || August 28, 2000 || Socorro || LINEAR || — || align=right | 2.2 km || 
|-id=383 bgcolor=#E9E9E9
| 87383 ||  || — || August 28, 2000 || Socorro || LINEAR || — || align=right | 4.9 km || 
|-id=384 bgcolor=#E9E9E9
| 87384 ||  || — || August 28, 2000 || Socorro || LINEAR || — || align=right | 3.4 km || 
|-id=385 bgcolor=#E9E9E9
| 87385 ||  || — || August 28, 2000 || Socorro || LINEAR || — || align=right | 2.2 km || 
|-id=386 bgcolor=#E9E9E9
| 87386 ||  || — || August 28, 2000 || Socorro || LINEAR || — || align=right | 2.4 km || 
|-id=387 bgcolor=#E9E9E9
| 87387 ||  || — || August 28, 2000 || Socorro || LINEAR || ADE || align=right | 3.0 km || 
|-id=388 bgcolor=#d6d6d6
| 87388 ||  || — || August 28, 2000 || Socorro || LINEAR || — || align=right | 6.4 km || 
|-id=389 bgcolor=#E9E9E9
| 87389 ||  || — || August 28, 2000 || Socorro || LINEAR || — || align=right | 5.5 km || 
|-id=390 bgcolor=#d6d6d6
| 87390 ||  || — || August 28, 2000 || Socorro || LINEAR || — || align=right | 5.9 km || 
|-id=391 bgcolor=#E9E9E9
| 87391 ||  || — || August 28, 2000 || Socorro || LINEAR || — || align=right | 4.5 km || 
|-id=392 bgcolor=#E9E9E9
| 87392 ||  || — || August 29, 2000 || Reedy Creek || J. Broughton || — || align=right | 3.5 km || 
|-id=393 bgcolor=#E9E9E9
| 87393 ||  || — || August 27, 2000 || Needville || Needville Obs. || GEF || align=right | 2.7 km || 
|-id=394 bgcolor=#E9E9E9
| 87394 ||  || — || August 24, 2000 || Socorro || LINEAR || — || align=right | 1.5 km || 
|-id=395 bgcolor=#fefefe
| 87395 ||  || — || August 24, 2000 || Socorro || LINEAR || NYS || align=right | 2.0 km || 
|-id=396 bgcolor=#E9E9E9
| 87396 ||  || — || August 24, 2000 || Socorro || LINEAR || — || align=right | 2.4 km || 
|-id=397 bgcolor=#E9E9E9
| 87397 ||  || — || August 24, 2000 || Socorro || LINEAR || — || align=right | 2.6 km || 
|-id=398 bgcolor=#E9E9E9
| 87398 ||  || — || August 24, 2000 || Socorro || LINEAR || EUN || align=right | 2.6 km || 
|-id=399 bgcolor=#E9E9E9
| 87399 ||  || — || August 24, 2000 || Socorro || LINEAR || — || align=right | 2.9 km || 
|-id=400 bgcolor=#d6d6d6
| 87400 ||  || — || August 24, 2000 || Socorro || LINEAR || — || align=right | 5.3 km || 
|}

87401–87500 

|-bgcolor=#E9E9E9
| 87401 ||  || — || August 24, 2000 || Socorro || LINEAR || — || align=right | 4.0 km || 
|-id=402 bgcolor=#E9E9E9
| 87402 ||  || — || August 24, 2000 || Socorro || LINEAR || — || align=right | 3.6 km || 
|-id=403 bgcolor=#E9E9E9
| 87403 ||  || — || August 24, 2000 || Socorro || LINEAR || — || align=right | 3.0 km || 
|-id=404 bgcolor=#E9E9E9
| 87404 ||  || — || August 24, 2000 || Socorro || LINEAR || — || align=right | 2.6 km || 
|-id=405 bgcolor=#E9E9E9
| 87405 ||  || — || August 24, 2000 || Socorro || LINEAR || — || align=right | 2.3 km || 
|-id=406 bgcolor=#E9E9E9
| 87406 ||  || — || August 24, 2000 || Socorro || LINEAR || — || align=right | 4.4 km || 
|-id=407 bgcolor=#E9E9E9
| 87407 ||  || — || August 24, 2000 || Socorro || LINEAR || MAR || align=right | 3.0 km || 
|-id=408 bgcolor=#E9E9E9
| 87408 ||  || — || August 24, 2000 || Socorro || LINEAR || — || align=right | 2.5 km || 
|-id=409 bgcolor=#d6d6d6
| 87409 ||  || — || August 25, 2000 || Socorro || LINEAR || HYG || align=right | 4.8 km || 
|-id=410 bgcolor=#E9E9E9
| 87410 ||  || — || August 25, 2000 || Socorro || LINEAR || — || align=right | 2.1 km || 
|-id=411 bgcolor=#E9E9E9
| 87411 ||  || — || August 25, 2000 || Socorro || LINEAR || EUN || align=right | 3.6 km || 
|-id=412 bgcolor=#E9E9E9
| 87412 ||  || — || August 25, 2000 || Socorro || LINEAR || EUN || align=right | 3.2 km || 
|-id=413 bgcolor=#E9E9E9
| 87413 ||  || — || August 25, 2000 || Socorro || LINEAR || — || align=right | 3.4 km || 
|-id=414 bgcolor=#E9E9E9
| 87414 ||  || — || August 25, 2000 || Socorro || LINEAR || — || align=right | 2.3 km || 
|-id=415 bgcolor=#E9E9E9
| 87415 ||  || — || August 25, 2000 || Socorro || LINEAR || — || align=right | 1.9 km || 
|-id=416 bgcolor=#E9E9E9
| 87416 ||  || — || August 25, 2000 || Socorro || LINEAR || — || align=right | 2.0 km || 
|-id=417 bgcolor=#E9E9E9
| 87417 ||  || — || August 26, 2000 || Socorro || LINEAR || — || align=right | 2.3 km || 
|-id=418 bgcolor=#E9E9E9
| 87418 ||  || — || August 26, 2000 || Socorro || LINEAR || — || align=right | 2.8 km || 
|-id=419 bgcolor=#d6d6d6
| 87419 ||  || — || August 26, 2000 || Socorro || LINEAR || — || align=right | 9.1 km || 
|-id=420 bgcolor=#E9E9E9
| 87420 ||  || — || August 26, 2000 || Socorro || LINEAR || — || align=right | 2.7 km || 
|-id=421 bgcolor=#E9E9E9
| 87421 ||  || — || August 28, 2000 || Socorro || LINEAR || — || align=right | 2.2 km || 
|-id=422 bgcolor=#E9E9E9
| 87422 ||  || — || August 28, 2000 || Socorro || LINEAR || — || align=right | 1.6 km || 
|-id=423 bgcolor=#E9E9E9
| 87423 ||  || — || August 28, 2000 || Socorro || LINEAR || VIB || align=right | 4.1 km || 
|-id=424 bgcolor=#E9E9E9
| 87424 ||  || — || August 28, 2000 || Socorro || LINEAR || — || align=right | 2.6 km || 
|-id=425 bgcolor=#E9E9E9
| 87425 ||  || — || August 28, 2000 || Socorro || LINEAR || RAF || align=right | 2.0 km || 
|-id=426 bgcolor=#E9E9E9
| 87426 ||  || — || August 28, 2000 || Socorro || LINEAR || — || align=right | 3.9 km || 
|-id=427 bgcolor=#E9E9E9
| 87427 ||  || — || August 28, 2000 || Socorro || LINEAR || — || align=right | 2.6 km || 
|-id=428 bgcolor=#E9E9E9
| 87428 ||  || — || August 28, 2000 || Socorro || LINEAR || — || align=right | 7.2 km || 
|-id=429 bgcolor=#d6d6d6
| 87429 ||  || — || August 28, 2000 || Socorro || LINEAR || — || align=right | 5.3 km || 
|-id=430 bgcolor=#E9E9E9
| 87430 ||  || — || August 28, 2000 || Socorro || LINEAR || — || align=right | 2.5 km || 
|-id=431 bgcolor=#d6d6d6
| 87431 ||  || — || August 28, 2000 || Socorro || LINEAR || EOS || align=right | 5.0 km || 
|-id=432 bgcolor=#E9E9E9
| 87432 ||  || — || August 28, 2000 || Socorro || LINEAR || — || align=right | 3.4 km || 
|-id=433 bgcolor=#E9E9E9
| 87433 ||  || — || August 28, 2000 || Socorro || LINEAR || — || align=right | 3.4 km || 
|-id=434 bgcolor=#d6d6d6
| 87434 ||  || — || August 28, 2000 || Socorro || LINEAR || — || align=right | 8.2 km || 
|-id=435 bgcolor=#E9E9E9
| 87435 ||  || — || August 29, 2000 || Socorro || LINEAR || — || align=right | 3.1 km || 
|-id=436 bgcolor=#d6d6d6
| 87436 ||  || — || August 29, 2000 || Socorro || LINEAR || KOR || align=right | 2.9 km || 
|-id=437 bgcolor=#E9E9E9
| 87437 ||  || — || August 29, 2000 || Socorro || LINEAR || — || align=right | 7.5 km || 
|-id=438 bgcolor=#E9E9E9
| 87438 ||  || — || August 29, 2000 || Socorro || LINEAR || — || align=right | 1.5 km || 
|-id=439 bgcolor=#d6d6d6
| 87439 ||  || — || August 29, 2000 || Socorro || LINEAR || HYG || align=right | 5.4 km || 
|-id=440 bgcolor=#E9E9E9
| 87440 ||  || — || August 24, 2000 || Socorro || LINEAR || — || align=right | 2.6 km || 
|-id=441 bgcolor=#E9E9E9
| 87441 ||  || — || August 24, 2000 || Socorro || LINEAR || — || align=right | 4.7 km || 
|-id=442 bgcolor=#d6d6d6
| 87442 ||  || — || August 24, 2000 || Socorro || LINEAR || — || align=right | 4.9 km || 
|-id=443 bgcolor=#E9E9E9
| 87443 ||  || — || August 24, 2000 || Socorro || LINEAR || — || align=right | 4.2 km || 
|-id=444 bgcolor=#E9E9E9
| 87444 ||  || — || August 24, 2000 || Socorro || LINEAR || — || align=right | 2.4 km || 
|-id=445 bgcolor=#E9E9E9
| 87445 ||  || — || August 24, 2000 || Socorro || LINEAR || — || align=right | 1.9 km || 
|-id=446 bgcolor=#E9E9E9
| 87446 ||  || — || August 24, 2000 || Socorro || LINEAR || — || align=right | 4.4 km || 
|-id=447 bgcolor=#E9E9E9
| 87447 ||  || — || August 28, 2000 || Socorro || LINEAR || — || align=right | 3.3 km || 
|-id=448 bgcolor=#E9E9E9
| 87448 ||  || — || August 25, 2000 || Socorro || LINEAR || MAR || align=right | 3.1 km || 
|-id=449 bgcolor=#E9E9E9
| 87449 ||  || — || August 25, 2000 || Socorro || LINEAR || — || align=right | 6.1 km || 
|-id=450 bgcolor=#E9E9E9
| 87450 ||  || — || August 25, 2000 || Socorro || LINEAR || — || align=right | 4.0 km || 
|-id=451 bgcolor=#E9E9E9
| 87451 ||  || — || August 25, 2000 || Socorro || LINEAR || — || align=right | 2.4 km || 
|-id=452 bgcolor=#E9E9E9
| 87452 ||  || — || August 25, 2000 || Socorro || LINEAR || WIT || align=right | 2.5 km || 
|-id=453 bgcolor=#E9E9E9
| 87453 ||  || — || August 25, 2000 || Socorro || LINEAR || — || align=right | 3.0 km || 
|-id=454 bgcolor=#d6d6d6
| 87454 ||  || — || August 25, 2000 || Socorro || LINEAR || — || align=right | 8.0 km || 
|-id=455 bgcolor=#E9E9E9
| 87455 ||  || — || August 25, 2000 || Socorro || LINEAR || — || align=right | 8.2 km || 
|-id=456 bgcolor=#E9E9E9
| 87456 ||  || — || August 25, 2000 || Socorro || LINEAR || — || align=right | 2.2 km || 
|-id=457 bgcolor=#E9E9E9
| 87457 ||  || — || August 25, 2000 || Socorro || LINEAR || — || align=right | 3.2 km || 
|-id=458 bgcolor=#E9E9E9
| 87458 ||  || — || August 28, 2000 || Socorro || LINEAR || — || align=right | 3.4 km || 
|-id=459 bgcolor=#E9E9E9
| 87459 ||  || — || August 31, 2000 || Socorro || LINEAR || — || align=right | 2.3 km || 
|-id=460 bgcolor=#E9E9E9
| 87460 ||  || — || August 31, 2000 || Socorro || LINEAR || — || align=right | 2.1 km || 
|-id=461 bgcolor=#E9E9E9
| 87461 ||  || — || August 24, 2000 || Socorro || LINEAR || — || align=right | 3.9 km || 
|-id=462 bgcolor=#E9E9E9
| 87462 ||  || — || August 24, 2000 || Socorro || LINEAR || — || align=right | 3.0 km || 
|-id=463 bgcolor=#E9E9E9
| 87463 ||  || — || August 25, 2000 || Socorro || LINEAR || — || align=right | 3.1 km || 
|-id=464 bgcolor=#E9E9E9
| 87464 ||  || — || August 31, 2000 || Reedy Creek || J. Broughton || — || align=right | 3.0 km || 
|-id=465 bgcolor=#E9E9E9
| 87465 ||  || — || August 24, 2000 || Socorro || LINEAR || — || align=right | 2.0 km || 
|-id=466 bgcolor=#E9E9E9
| 87466 ||  || — || August 24, 2000 || Socorro || LINEAR || — || align=right | 5.9 km || 
|-id=467 bgcolor=#fefefe
| 87467 ||  || — || August 24, 2000 || Socorro || LINEAR || V || align=right | 1.7 km || 
|-id=468 bgcolor=#fefefe
| 87468 ||  || — || August 24, 2000 || Socorro || LINEAR || — || align=right | 2.2 km || 
|-id=469 bgcolor=#E9E9E9
| 87469 ||  || — || August 25, 2000 || Socorro || LINEAR || — || align=right | 2.2 km || 
|-id=470 bgcolor=#E9E9E9
| 87470 ||  || — || August 26, 2000 || Socorro || LINEAR || HNS || align=right | 3.3 km || 
|-id=471 bgcolor=#E9E9E9
| 87471 ||  || — || August 26, 2000 || Socorro || LINEAR || — || align=right | 2.1 km || 
|-id=472 bgcolor=#E9E9E9
| 87472 ||  || — || August 26, 2000 || Socorro || LINEAR || — || align=right | 2.2 km || 
|-id=473 bgcolor=#E9E9E9
| 87473 ||  || — || August 31, 2000 || Socorro || LINEAR || — || align=right | 3.0 km || 
|-id=474 bgcolor=#E9E9E9
| 87474 ||  || — || August 31, 2000 || Socorro || LINEAR || — || align=right | 2.7 km || 
|-id=475 bgcolor=#fefefe
| 87475 ||  || — || August 31, 2000 || Socorro || LINEAR || — || align=right | 2.7 km || 
|-id=476 bgcolor=#E9E9E9
| 87476 ||  || — || August 31, 2000 || Socorro || LINEAR || — || align=right | 2.5 km || 
|-id=477 bgcolor=#E9E9E9
| 87477 ||  || — || August 31, 2000 || Socorro || LINEAR || — || align=right | 2.6 km || 
|-id=478 bgcolor=#d6d6d6
| 87478 ||  || — || August 31, 2000 || Socorro || LINEAR || — || align=right | 3.9 km || 
|-id=479 bgcolor=#d6d6d6
| 87479 ||  || — || August 31, 2000 || Socorro || LINEAR || — || align=right | 6.6 km || 
|-id=480 bgcolor=#E9E9E9
| 87480 ||  || — || August 31, 2000 || Socorro || LINEAR || — || align=right | 1.7 km || 
|-id=481 bgcolor=#E9E9E9
| 87481 ||  || — || August 31, 2000 || Socorro || LINEAR || — || align=right | 2.3 km || 
|-id=482 bgcolor=#E9E9E9
| 87482 ||  || — || August 31, 2000 || Socorro || LINEAR || — || align=right | 4.9 km || 
|-id=483 bgcolor=#E9E9E9
| 87483 ||  || — || August 24, 2000 || Socorro || LINEAR || GEF || align=right | 4.4 km || 
|-id=484 bgcolor=#E9E9E9
| 87484 ||  || — || August 25, 2000 || Socorro || LINEAR || — || align=right | 3.2 km || 
|-id=485 bgcolor=#E9E9E9
| 87485 ||  || — || August 25, 2000 || Socorro || LINEAR || — || align=right | 8.2 km || 
|-id=486 bgcolor=#E9E9E9
| 87486 ||  || — || August 29, 2000 || Socorro || LINEAR || EUN || align=right | 2.6 km || 
|-id=487 bgcolor=#E9E9E9
| 87487 ||  || — || August 31, 2000 || Socorro || LINEAR || ADE || align=right | 4.5 km || 
|-id=488 bgcolor=#E9E9E9
| 87488 ||  || — || August 31, 2000 || Socorro || LINEAR || — || align=right | 4.9 km || 
|-id=489 bgcolor=#E9E9E9
| 87489 ||  || — || August 31, 2000 || Socorro || LINEAR || GEF || align=right | 3.1 km || 
|-id=490 bgcolor=#E9E9E9
| 87490 ||  || — || August 31, 2000 || Socorro || LINEAR || MAR || align=right | 2.6 km || 
|-id=491 bgcolor=#E9E9E9
| 87491 ||  || — || August 31, 2000 || Socorro || LINEAR || — || align=right | 3.9 km || 
|-id=492 bgcolor=#E9E9E9
| 87492 ||  || — || August 31, 2000 || Socorro || LINEAR || DOR || align=right | 6.0 km || 
|-id=493 bgcolor=#E9E9E9
| 87493 ||  || — || August 31, 2000 || Socorro || LINEAR || — || align=right | 3.7 km || 
|-id=494 bgcolor=#d6d6d6
| 87494 ||  || — || August 31, 2000 || Socorro || LINEAR || EOS || align=right | 4.4 km || 
|-id=495 bgcolor=#E9E9E9
| 87495 ||  || — || August 31, 2000 || Socorro || LINEAR || — || align=right | 4.9 km || 
|-id=496 bgcolor=#E9E9E9
| 87496 ||  || — || August 31, 2000 || Socorro || LINEAR || — || align=right | 2.7 km || 
|-id=497 bgcolor=#E9E9E9
| 87497 ||  || — || August 31, 2000 || Socorro || LINEAR || — || align=right | 3.7 km || 
|-id=498 bgcolor=#E9E9E9
| 87498 ||  || — || August 31, 2000 || Socorro || LINEAR || — || align=right | 2.6 km || 
|-id=499 bgcolor=#E9E9E9
| 87499 ||  || — || August 31, 2000 || Socorro || LINEAR || — || align=right | 2.6 km || 
|-id=500 bgcolor=#E9E9E9
| 87500 ||  || — || August 31, 2000 || Socorro || LINEAR || RAF || align=right | 1.7 km || 
|}

87501–87600 

|-bgcolor=#E9E9E9
| 87501 ||  || — || August 31, 2000 || Socorro || LINEAR || — || align=right | 3.2 km || 
|-id=502 bgcolor=#d6d6d6
| 87502 ||  || — || August 31, 2000 || Socorro || LINEAR || — || align=right | 6.1 km || 
|-id=503 bgcolor=#E9E9E9
| 87503 ||  || — || August 31, 2000 || Socorro || LINEAR || — || align=right | 2.5 km || 
|-id=504 bgcolor=#E9E9E9
| 87504 ||  || — || August 31, 2000 || Socorro || LINEAR || — || align=right | 3.3 km || 
|-id=505 bgcolor=#E9E9E9
| 87505 ||  || — || August 31, 2000 || Socorro || LINEAR || — || align=right | 2.0 km || 
|-id=506 bgcolor=#d6d6d6
| 87506 ||  || — || August 31, 2000 || Socorro || LINEAR || — || align=right | 5.8 km || 
|-id=507 bgcolor=#fefefe
| 87507 ||  || — || August 31, 2000 || Socorro || LINEAR || — || align=right | 2.3 km || 
|-id=508 bgcolor=#E9E9E9
| 87508 ||  || — || August 31, 2000 || Socorro || LINEAR || PAD || align=right | 3.7 km || 
|-id=509 bgcolor=#E9E9E9
| 87509 ||  || — || August 31, 2000 || Socorro || LINEAR || — || align=right | 3.0 km || 
|-id=510 bgcolor=#d6d6d6
| 87510 ||  || — || August 24, 2000 || Socorro || LINEAR || — || align=right | 6.1 km || 
|-id=511 bgcolor=#fefefe
| 87511 ||  || — || August 26, 2000 || Socorro || LINEAR || — || align=right | 1.7 km || 
|-id=512 bgcolor=#E9E9E9
| 87512 ||  || — || August 26, 2000 || Socorro || LINEAR || — || align=right | 2.0 km || 
|-id=513 bgcolor=#E9E9E9
| 87513 ||  || — || August 26, 2000 || Socorro || LINEAR || — || align=right | 2.6 km || 
|-id=514 bgcolor=#E9E9E9
| 87514 ||  || — || August 26, 2000 || Socorro || LINEAR || ADE || align=right | 5.9 km || 
|-id=515 bgcolor=#E9E9E9
| 87515 ||  || — || August 26, 2000 || Socorro || LINEAR || — || align=right | 1.8 km || 
|-id=516 bgcolor=#E9E9E9
| 87516 ||  || — || August 26, 2000 || Socorro || LINEAR || — || align=right | 4.4 km || 
|-id=517 bgcolor=#fefefe
| 87517 ||  || — || August 26, 2000 || Socorro || LINEAR || V || align=right | 1.7 km || 
|-id=518 bgcolor=#d6d6d6
| 87518 ||  || — || August 26, 2000 || Socorro || LINEAR || — || align=right | 4.7 km || 
|-id=519 bgcolor=#fefefe
| 87519 ||  || — || August 26, 2000 || Socorro || LINEAR || — || align=right | 2.1 km || 
|-id=520 bgcolor=#fefefe
| 87520 ||  || — || August 26, 2000 || Socorro || LINEAR || V || align=right | 2.4 km || 
|-id=521 bgcolor=#fefefe
| 87521 ||  || — || August 26, 2000 || Socorro || LINEAR || — || align=right | 2.5 km || 
|-id=522 bgcolor=#E9E9E9
| 87522 ||  || — || August 29, 2000 || Socorro || LINEAR || — || align=right | 4.8 km || 
|-id=523 bgcolor=#fefefe
| 87523 ||  || — || August 29, 2000 || Socorro || LINEAR || EUT || align=right | 1.4 km || 
|-id=524 bgcolor=#E9E9E9
| 87524 ||  || — || August 29, 2000 || Socorro || LINEAR || EUN || align=right | 2.3 km || 
|-id=525 bgcolor=#E9E9E9
| 87525 ||  || — || August 29, 2000 || Socorro || LINEAR || — || align=right | 5.0 km || 
|-id=526 bgcolor=#d6d6d6
| 87526 ||  || — || August 29, 2000 || Socorro || LINEAR || — || align=right | 4.0 km || 
|-id=527 bgcolor=#E9E9E9
| 87527 ||  || — || August 29, 2000 || Socorro || LINEAR || — || align=right | 3.3 km || 
|-id=528 bgcolor=#E9E9E9
| 87528 ||  || — || August 29, 2000 || Socorro || LINEAR || — || align=right | 2.8 km || 
|-id=529 bgcolor=#E9E9E9
| 87529 ||  || — || August 29, 2000 || Socorro || LINEAR || — || align=right | 2.3 km || 
|-id=530 bgcolor=#E9E9E9
| 87530 ||  || — || August 29, 2000 || Socorro || LINEAR || — || align=right | 2.5 km || 
|-id=531 bgcolor=#E9E9E9
| 87531 ||  || — || August 29, 2000 || Socorro || LINEAR || MAR || align=right | 2.0 km || 
|-id=532 bgcolor=#d6d6d6
| 87532 ||  || — || August 29, 2000 || Socorro || LINEAR || HYG || align=right | 6.7 km || 
|-id=533 bgcolor=#E9E9E9
| 87533 ||  || — || August 29, 2000 || Socorro || LINEAR || — || align=right | 1.5 km || 
|-id=534 bgcolor=#E9E9E9
| 87534 ||  || — || August 29, 2000 || Socorro || LINEAR || EUN || align=right | 2.9 km || 
|-id=535 bgcolor=#d6d6d6
| 87535 ||  || — || August 29, 2000 || Socorro || LINEAR || — || align=right | 3.1 km || 
|-id=536 bgcolor=#E9E9E9
| 87536 ||  || — || August 29, 2000 || Socorro || LINEAR || — || align=right | 4.6 km || 
|-id=537 bgcolor=#E9E9E9
| 87537 ||  || — || August 31, 2000 || Socorro || LINEAR || — || align=right | 1.8 km || 
|-id=538 bgcolor=#d6d6d6
| 87538 ||  || — || August 31, 2000 || Socorro || LINEAR || — || align=right | 7.5 km || 
|-id=539 bgcolor=#E9E9E9
| 87539 ||  || — || August 31, 2000 || Socorro || LINEAR || — || align=right | 4.5 km || 
|-id=540 bgcolor=#E9E9E9
| 87540 ||  || — || August 31, 2000 || Socorro || LINEAR || — || align=right | 3.0 km || 
|-id=541 bgcolor=#E9E9E9
| 87541 ||  || — || August 31, 2000 || Socorro || LINEAR || — || align=right | 2.7 km || 
|-id=542 bgcolor=#d6d6d6
| 87542 ||  || — || August 31, 2000 || Socorro || LINEAR || — || align=right | 6.0 km || 
|-id=543 bgcolor=#E9E9E9
| 87543 ||  || — || August 31, 2000 || Socorro || LINEAR || — || align=right | 2.6 km || 
|-id=544 bgcolor=#d6d6d6
| 87544 ||  || — || August 31, 2000 || Socorro || LINEAR || — || align=right | 8.6 km || 
|-id=545 bgcolor=#d6d6d6
| 87545 ||  || — || August 31, 2000 || Socorro || LINEAR || EOS || align=right | 5.5 km || 
|-id=546 bgcolor=#d6d6d6
| 87546 ||  || — || August 31, 2000 || Socorro || LINEAR || EOS || align=right | 4.7 km || 
|-id=547 bgcolor=#E9E9E9
| 87547 ||  || — || August 21, 2000 || Anderson Mesa || LONEOS || — || align=right | 3.5 km || 
|-id=548 bgcolor=#E9E9E9
| 87548 ||  || — || August 21, 2000 || Anderson Mesa || LONEOS || — || align=right | 2.4 km || 
|-id=549 bgcolor=#E9E9E9
| 87549 ||  || — || August 21, 2000 || Anderson Mesa || LONEOS || — || align=right | 2.6 km || 
|-id=550 bgcolor=#d6d6d6
| 87550 ||  || — || August 26, 2000 || Haleakala || NEAT || EOS || align=right | 5.0 km || 
|-id=551 bgcolor=#fefefe
| 87551 ||  || — || August 31, 2000 || Socorro || LINEAR || — || align=right | 5.7 km || 
|-id=552 bgcolor=#E9E9E9
| 87552 ||  || — || August 31, 2000 || Socorro || LINEAR || — || align=right | 2.5 km || 
|-id=553 bgcolor=#E9E9E9
| 87553 ||  || — || August 31, 2000 || Socorro || LINEAR || MAR || align=right | 3.4 km || 
|-id=554 bgcolor=#E9E9E9
| 87554 ||  || — || August 29, 2000 || Socorro || LINEAR || — || align=right | 5.7 km || 
|-id=555 bgcolor=#C2E0FF
| 87555 ||  || — || August 25, 2000 || Cerro Tololo || Cerro Tololo Obs. || centaurcritical || align=right | 102 km || 
|-id=556 bgcolor=#E9E9E9
| 87556 ||  || — || September 1, 2000 || Socorro || LINEAR || GER || align=right | 5.3 km || 
|-id=557 bgcolor=#fefefe
| 87557 ||  || — || September 1, 2000 || Socorro || LINEAR || — || align=right | 2.9 km || 
|-id=558 bgcolor=#E9E9E9
| 87558 ||  || — || September 1, 2000 || Socorro || LINEAR || — || align=right | 4.2 km || 
|-id=559 bgcolor=#E9E9E9
| 87559 ||  || — || September 1, 2000 || Socorro || LINEAR || — || align=right | 2.9 km || 
|-id=560 bgcolor=#E9E9E9
| 87560 ||  || — || September 1, 2000 || Socorro || LINEAR || — || align=right | 2.3 km || 
|-id=561 bgcolor=#E9E9E9
| 87561 ||  || — || September 1, 2000 || Socorro || LINEAR || — || align=right | 4.1 km || 
|-id=562 bgcolor=#E9E9E9
| 87562 ||  || — || September 1, 2000 || Socorro || LINEAR || — || align=right | 4.8 km || 
|-id=563 bgcolor=#E9E9E9
| 87563 ||  || — || September 1, 2000 || Socorro || LINEAR || — || align=right | 2.2 km || 
|-id=564 bgcolor=#E9E9E9
| 87564 ||  || — || September 1, 2000 || Socorro || LINEAR || — || align=right | 2.3 km || 
|-id=565 bgcolor=#E9E9E9
| 87565 ||  || — || September 1, 2000 || Socorro || LINEAR || — || align=right | 5.7 km || 
|-id=566 bgcolor=#E9E9E9
| 87566 ||  || — || September 1, 2000 || Socorro || LINEAR || — || align=right | 5.1 km || 
|-id=567 bgcolor=#E9E9E9
| 87567 ||  || — || September 1, 2000 || Socorro || LINEAR || — || align=right | 2.5 km || 
|-id=568 bgcolor=#E9E9E9
| 87568 ||  || — || September 3, 2000 || Socorro || LINEAR || — || align=right | 4.0 km || 
|-id=569 bgcolor=#E9E9E9
| 87569 ||  || — || September 1, 2000 || Socorro || LINEAR || MAR || align=right | 2.4 km || 
|-id=570 bgcolor=#E9E9E9
| 87570 ||  || — || September 1, 2000 || Socorro || LINEAR || — || align=right | 2.8 km || 
|-id=571 bgcolor=#E9E9E9
| 87571 ||  || — || September 1, 2000 || Socorro || LINEAR || — || align=right | 4.5 km || 
|-id=572 bgcolor=#E9E9E9
| 87572 ||  || — || September 1, 2000 || Socorro || LINEAR || EUN || align=right | 2.5 km || 
|-id=573 bgcolor=#d6d6d6
| 87573 ||  || — || September 1, 2000 || Socorro || LINEAR || EOS || align=right | 4.5 km || 
|-id=574 bgcolor=#E9E9E9
| 87574 ||  || — || September 1, 2000 || Socorro || LINEAR || DOR || align=right | 4.5 km || 
|-id=575 bgcolor=#d6d6d6
| 87575 ||  || — || September 1, 2000 || Socorro || LINEAR || EOS || align=right | 4.7 km || 
|-id=576 bgcolor=#d6d6d6
| 87576 ||  || — || September 1, 2000 || Socorro || LINEAR || EOS || align=right | 4.8 km || 
|-id=577 bgcolor=#E9E9E9
| 87577 ||  || — || September 1, 2000 || Socorro || LINEAR || — || align=right | 2.5 km || 
|-id=578 bgcolor=#d6d6d6
| 87578 ||  || — || September 1, 2000 || Socorro || LINEAR || — || align=right | 6.7 km || 
|-id=579 bgcolor=#E9E9E9
| 87579 ||  || — || September 1, 2000 || Socorro || LINEAR || ADE || align=right | 4.8 km || 
|-id=580 bgcolor=#E9E9E9
| 87580 ||  || — || September 1, 2000 || Socorro || LINEAR || MARslow || align=right | 3.2 km || 
|-id=581 bgcolor=#E9E9E9
| 87581 ||  || — || September 1, 2000 || Socorro || LINEAR || — || align=right | 3.2 km || 
|-id=582 bgcolor=#E9E9E9
| 87582 ||  || — || September 1, 2000 || Socorro || LINEAR || — || align=right | 3.6 km || 
|-id=583 bgcolor=#d6d6d6
| 87583 ||  || — || September 1, 2000 || Socorro || LINEAR || — || align=right | 3.0 km || 
|-id=584 bgcolor=#E9E9E9
| 87584 ||  || — || September 1, 2000 || Socorro || LINEAR || EUN || align=right | 2.6 km || 
|-id=585 bgcolor=#E9E9E9
| 87585 ||  || — || September 1, 2000 || Socorro || LINEAR || — || align=right | 3.8 km || 
|-id=586 bgcolor=#E9E9E9
| 87586 ||  || — || September 1, 2000 || Socorro || LINEAR || — || align=right | 2.3 km || 
|-id=587 bgcolor=#E9E9E9
| 87587 ||  || — || September 1, 2000 || Socorro || LINEAR || MAR || align=right | 2.4 km || 
|-id=588 bgcolor=#E9E9E9
| 87588 ||  || — || September 1, 2000 || Socorro || LINEAR || — || align=right | 3.2 km || 
|-id=589 bgcolor=#E9E9E9
| 87589 ||  || — || September 1, 2000 || Socorro || LINEAR || — || align=right | 2.3 km || 
|-id=590 bgcolor=#d6d6d6
| 87590 ||  || — || September 1, 2000 || Socorro || LINEAR || — || align=right | 6.0 km || 
|-id=591 bgcolor=#E9E9E9
| 87591 ||  || — || September 1, 2000 || Socorro || LINEAR || — || align=right | 2.7 km || 
|-id=592 bgcolor=#d6d6d6
| 87592 ||  || — || September 1, 2000 || Socorro || LINEAR || EOS || align=right | 4.7 km || 
|-id=593 bgcolor=#E9E9E9
| 87593 ||  || — || September 1, 2000 || Socorro || LINEAR || — || align=right | 2.0 km || 
|-id=594 bgcolor=#d6d6d6
| 87594 ||  || — || September 1, 2000 || Socorro || LINEAR || — || align=right | 3.5 km || 
|-id=595 bgcolor=#E9E9E9
| 87595 ||  || — || September 1, 2000 || Socorro || LINEAR || — || align=right | 4.5 km || 
|-id=596 bgcolor=#d6d6d6
| 87596 ||  || — || September 1, 2000 || Socorro || LINEAR || — || align=right | 5.4 km || 
|-id=597 bgcolor=#E9E9E9
| 87597 ||  || — || September 1, 2000 || Socorro || LINEAR || PAD || align=right | 4.5 km || 
|-id=598 bgcolor=#E9E9E9
| 87598 ||  || — || September 1, 2000 || Socorro || LINEAR || MRX || align=right | 2.6 km || 
|-id=599 bgcolor=#E9E9E9
| 87599 ||  || — || September 1, 2000 || Socorro || LINEAR || — || align=right | 8.7 km || 
|-id=600 bgcolor=#E9E9E9
| 87600 ||  || — || September 1, 2000 || Socorro || LINEAR || — || align=right | 5.2 km || 
|}

87601–87700 

|-bgcolor=#E9E9E9
| 87601 ||  || — || September 3, 2000 || Socorro || LINEAR || — || align=right | 3.3 km || 
|-id=602 bgcolor=#E9E9E9
| 87602 ||  || — || September 3, 2000 || Socorro || LINEAR || — || align=right | 7.0 km || 
|-id=603 bgcolor=#E9E9E9
| 87603 ||  || — || September 3, 2000 || Socorro || LINEAR || — || align=right | 3.5 km || 
|-id=604 bgcolor=#E9E9E9
| 87604 ||  || — || September 3, 2000 || Socorro || LINEAR || — || align=right | 3.1 km || 
|-id=605 bgcolor=#d6d6d6
| 87605 ||  || — || September 3, 2000 || Socorro || LINEAR || — || align=right | 4.9 km || 
|-id=606 bgcolor=#E9E9E9
| 87606 ||  || — || September 3, 2000 || Socorro || LINEAR || — || align=right | 2.2 km || 
|-id=607 bgcolor=#E9E9E9
| 87607 ||  || — || September 3, 2000 || Socorro || LINEAR || — || align=right | 3.2 km || 
|-id=608 bgcolor=#E9E9E9
| 87608 ||  || — || September 3, 2000 || Socorro || LINEAR || — || align=right | 6.1 km || 
|-id=609 bgcolor=#fefefe
| 87609 ||  || — || September 3, 2000 || Socorro || LINEAR || V || align=right | 1.7 km || 
|-id=610 bgcolor=#E9E9E9
| 87610 ||  || — || September 3, 2000 || Socorro || LINEAR || — || align=right | 4.2 km || 
|-id=611 bgcolor=#E9E9E9
| 87611 ||  || — || September 3, 2000 || Socorro || LINEAR || — || align=right | 3.9 km || 
|-id=612 bgcolor=#E9E9E9
| 87612 ||  || — || September 3, 2000 || Socorro || LINEAR || — || align=right | 2.8 km || 
|-id=613 bgcolor=#E9E9E9
| 87613 ||  || — || September 3, 2000 || Socorro || LINEAR || BRU || align=right | 5.9 km || 
|-id=614 bgcolor=#E9E9E9
| 87614 ||  || — || September 3, 2000 || Socorro || LINEAR || — || align=right | 2.8 km || 
|-id=615 bgcolor=#E9E9E9
| 87615 ||  || — || September 3, 2000 || Socorro || LINEAR || MAR || align=right | 2.6 km || 
|-id=616 bgcolor=#E9E9E9
| 87616 ||  || — || September 3, 2000 || Socorro || LINEAR || — || align=right | 4.8 km || 
|-id=617 bgcolor=#E9E9E9
| 87617 ||  || — || September 3, 2000 || Socorro || LINEAR || GEF || align=right | 4.6 km || 
|-id=618 bgcolor=#E9E9E9
| 87618 ||  || — || September 3, 2000 || Socorro || LINEAR || — || align=right | 3.8 km || 
|-id=619 bgcolor=#E9E9E9
| 87619 ||  || — || September 3, 2000 || Socorro || LINEAR || JUN || align=right | 3.6 km || 
|-id=620 bgcolor=#E9E9E9
| 87620 ||  || — || September 3, 2000 || Socorro || LINEAR || — || align=right | 3.2 km || 
|-id=621 bgcolor=#E9E9E9
| 87621 ||  || — || September 3, 2000 || Socorro || LINEAR || — || align=right | 4.8 km || 
|-id=622 bgcolor=#d6d6d6
| 87622 ||  || — || September 5, 2000 || Socorro || LINEAR || — || align=right | 5.4 km || 
|-id=623 bgcolor=#E9E9E9
| 87623 ||  || — || September 5, 2000 || Socorro || LINEAR || — || align=right | 7.4 km || 
|-id=624 bgcolor=#E9E9E9
| 87624 ||  || — || September 5, 2000 || Socorro || LINEAR || — || align=right | 4.7 km || 
|-id=625 bgcolor=#E9E9E9
| 87625 ||  || — || September 5, 2000 || Socorro || LINEAR || MAR || align=right | 3.9 km || 
|-id=626 bgcolor=#E9E9E9
| 87626 ||  || — || September 5, 2000 || Socorro || LINEAR || — || align=right | 3.1 km || 
|-id=627 bgcolor=#d6d6d6
| 87627 ||  || — || September 6, 2000 || Bisei SG Center || BATTeRS || MEL || align=right | 7.5 km || 
|-id=628 bgcolor=#E9E9E9
| 87628 ||  || — || September 3, 2000 || Socorro || LINEAR || MAR || align=right | 3.0 km || 
|-id=629 bgcolor=#E9E9E9
| 87629 ||  || — || September 3, 2000 || Socorro || LINEAR || TIN || align=right | 2.4 km || 
|-id=630 bgcolor=#E9E9E9
| 87630 ||  || — || September 3, 2000 || Socorro || LINEAR || EUN || align=right | 3.4 km || 
|-id=631 bgcolor=#d6d6d6
| 87631 ||  || — || September 1, 2000 || Socorro || LINEAR || — || align=right | 7.7 km || 
|-id=632 bgcolor=#E9E9E9
| 87632 ||  || — || September 1, 2000 || Socorro || LINEAR || — || align=right | 4.4 km || 
|-id=633 bgcolor=#E9E9E9
| 87633 ||  || — || September 1, 2000 || Socorro || LINEAR || — || align=right | 3.3 km || 
|-id=634 bgcolor=#E9E9E9
| 87634 ||  || — || September 1, 2000 || Socorro || LINEAR || — || align=right | 3.8 km || 
|-id=635 bgcolor=#E9E9E9
| 87635 ||  || — || September 1, 2000 || Socorro || LINEAR || GEF || align=right | 4.7 km || 
|-id=636 bgcolor=#E9E9E9
| 87636 ||  || — || September 1, 2000 || Socorro || LINEAR || INO || align=right | 4.2 km || 
|-id=637 bgcolor=#E9E9E9
| 87637 ||  || — || September 1, 2000 || Socorro || LINEAR || — || align=right | 2.4 km || 
|-id=638 bgcolor=#E9E9E9
| 87638 ||  || — || September 1, 2000 || Socorro || LINEAR || — || align=right | 6.7 km || 
|-id=639 bgcolor=#fefefe
| 87639 ||  || — || September 2, 2000 || Socorro || LINEAR || — || align=right | 3.3 km || 
|-id=640 bgcolor=#E9E9E9
| 87640 ||  || — || September 2, 2000 || Socorro || LINEAR || — || align=right | 2.3 km || 
|-id=641 bgcolor=#fefefe
| 87641 ||  || — || September 2, 2000 || Socorro || LINEAR || — || align=right | 2.4 km || 
|-id=642 bgcolor=#fefefe
| 87642 ||  || — || September 2, 2000 || Socorro || LINEAR || MAS || align=right | 2.5 km || 
|-id=643 bgcolor=#E9E9E9
| 87643 ||  || — || September 3, 2000 || Socorro || LINEAR || GEF || align=right | 3.7 km || 
|-id=644 bgcolor=#E9E9E9
| 87644 Cathomen ||  ||  || September 8, 2000 || Gnosca || S. Sposetti || ADE || align=right | 4.8 km || 
|-id=645 bgcolor=#E9E9E9
| 87645 ||  || — || September 9, 2000 || Gnosca || S. Sposetti || — || align=right | 2.5 km || 
|-id=646 bgcolor=#d6d6d6
| 87646 ||  || — || September 8, 2000 || Črni Vrh || Črni Vrh || EOS || align=right | 5.0 km || 
|-id=647 bgcolor=#E9E9E9
| 87647 ||  || — || September 1, 2000 || Socorro || LINEAR || HNS || align=right | 3.1 km || 
|-id=648 bgcolor=#E9E9E9
| 87648 ||  || — || September 1, 2000 || Socorro || LINEAR || — || align=right | 6.5 km || 
|-id=649 bgcolor=#E9E9E9
| 87649 ||  || — || September 1, 2000 || Socorro || LINEAR || — || align=right | 5.2 km || 
|-id=650 bgcolor=#d6d6d6
| 87650 ||  || — || September 1, 2000 || Socorro || LINEAR || — || align=right | 7.1 km || 
|-id=651 bgcolor=#E9E9E9
| 87651 ||  || — || September 1, 2000 || Socorro || LINEAR || EUN || align=right | 4.3 km || 
|-id=652 bgcolor=#E9E9E9
| 87652 ||  || — || September 2, 2000 || Socorro || LINEAR || — || align=right | 5.8 km || 
|-id=653 bgcolor=#E9E9E9
| 87653 ||  || — || September 2, 2000 || Anderson Mesa || LONEOS || — || align=right | 3.1 km || 
|-id=654 bgcolor=#d6d6d6
| 87654 ||  || — || September 3, 2000 || Socorro || LINEAR || EOS || align=right | 3.5 km || 
|-id=655 bgcolor=#E9E9E9
| 87655 ||  || — || September 3, 2000 || Socorro || LINEAR || — || align=right | 3.9 km || 
|-id=656 bgcolor=#d6d6d6
| 87656 ||  || — || September 3, 2000 || Socorro || LINEAR || — || align=right | 6.7 km || 
|-id=657 bgcolor=#E9E9E9
| 87657 ||  || — || September 3, 2000 || Kitt Peak || Spacewatch || MRX || align=right | 2.0 km || 
|-id=658 bgcolor=#d6d6d6
| 87658 ||  || — || September 3, 2000 || Socorro || LINEAR || — || align=right | 5.2 km || 
|-id=659 bgcolor=#d6d6d6
| 87659 ||  || — || September 4, 2000 || Anderson Mesa || LONEOS || — || align=right | 5.5 km || 
|-id=660 bgcolor=#E9E9E9
| 87660 ||  || — || September 4, 2000 || Anderson Mesa || LONEOS || — || align=right | 5.5 km || 
|-id=661 bgcolor=#E9E9E9
| 87661 ||  || — || September 4, 2000 || Anderson Mesa || LONEOS || WIT || align=right | 2.5 km || 
|-id=662 bgcolor=#E9E9E9
| 87662 ||  || — || September 4, 2000 || Haleakala || NEAT || — || align=right | 3.1 km || 
|-id=663 bgcolor=#E9E9E9
| 87663 ||  || — || September 5, 2000 || Anderson Mesa || LONEOS || — || align=right | 5.1 km || 
|-id=664 bgcolor=#E9E9E9
| 87664 ||  || — || September 5, 2000 || Anderson Mesa || LONEOS || — || align=right | 6.6 km || 
|-id=665 bgcolor=#E9E9E9
| 87665 ||  || — || September 5, 2000 || Anderson Mesa || LONEOS || — || align=right | 3.7 km || 
|-id=666 bgcolor=#E9E9E9
| 87666 ||  || — || September 5, 2000 || Anderson Mesa || LONEOS || — || align=right | 2.3 km || 
|-id=667 bgcolor=#E9E9E9
| 87667 ||  || — || September 5, 2000 || Anderson Mesa || LONEOS || MAR || align=right | 3.0 km || 
|-id=668 bgcolor=#E9E9E9
| 87668 ||  || — || September 5, 2000 || Anderson Mesa || LONEOS || EUN || align=right | 2.9 km || 
|-id=669 bgcolor=#E9E9E9
| 87669 ||  || — || September 5, 2000 || Anderson Mesa || LONEOS || — || align=right | 3.1 km || 
|-id=670 bgcolor=#E9E9E9
| 87670 ||  || — || September 5, 2000 || Anderson Mesa || LONEOS || ADE || align=right | 3.9 km || 
|-id=671 bgcolor=#E9E9E9
| 87671 ||  || — || September 5, 2000 || Anderson Mesa || LONEOS || EUN || align=right | 3.7 km || 
|-id=672 bgcolor=#d6d6d6
| 87672 ||  || — || September 5, 2000 || Anderson Mesa || LONEOS || AEG || align=right | 7.8 km || 
|-id=673 bgcolor=#E9E9E9
| 87673 ||  || — || September 5, 2000 || Anderson Mesa || LONEOS || MAR || align=right | 2.9 km || 
|-id=674 bgcolor=#E9E9E9
| 87674 ||  || — || September 5, 2000 || Anderson Mesa || LONEOS || MAR || align=right | 2.8 km || 
|-id=675 bgcolor=#E9E9E9
| 87675 ||  || — || September 5, 2000 || Anderson Mesa || LONEOS || MAR || align=right | 3.8 km || 
|-id=676 bgcolor=#E9E9E9
| 87676 ||  || — || September 5, 2000 || Anderson Mesa || LONEOS || — || align=right | 3.6 km || 
|-id=677 bgcolor=#E9E9E9
| 87677 ||  || — || September 5, 2000 || Anderson Mesa || LONEOS || — || align=right | 4.0 km || 
|-id=678 bgcolor=#E9E9E9
| 87678 ||  || — || September 6, 2000 || Socorro || LINEAR || — || align=right | 4.2 km || 
|-id=679 bgcolor=#E9E9E9
| 87679 ||  || — || September 6, 2000 || Socorro || LINEAR || — || align=right | 3.1 km || 
|-id=680 bgcolor=#E9E9E9
| 87680 ||  || — || September 7, 2000 || Socorro || LINEAR || — || align=right | 3.3 km || 
|-id=681 bgcolor=#E9E9E9
| 87681 ||  || — || September 7, 2000 || Socorro || LINEAR || JUN || align=right | 2.3 km || 
|-id=682 bgcolor=#E9E9E9
| 87682 ||  || — || September 20, 2000 || Socorro || LINEAR || — || align=right | 2.2 km || 
|-id=683 bgcolor=#E9E9E9
| 87683 ||  || — || September 19, 2000 || Haleakala || NEAT || — || align=right | 2.6 km || 
|-id=684 bgcolor=#FFC2E0
| 87684 ||  || — || September 20, 2000 || Socorro || LINEAR || ATE +1kmPHA || align=right | 2.2 km || 
|-id=685 bgcolor=#d6d6d6
| 87685 ||  || — || September 20, 2000 || Socorro || LINEAR || — || align=right | 7.7 km || 
|-id=686 bgcolor=#E9E9E9
| 87686 ||  || — || September 22, 2000 || Socorro || LINEAR || — || align=right | 2.3 km || 
|-id=687 bgcolor=#fefefe
| 87687 ||  || — || September 20, 2000 || Socorro || LINEAR || V || align=right | 1.8 km || 
|-id=688 bgcolor=#fefefe
| 87688 ||  || — || September 20, 2000 || Socorro || LINEAR || — || align=right | 4.2 km || 
|-id=689 bgcolor=#E9E9E9
| 87689 ||  || — || September 21, 2000 || Socorro || LINEAR || — || align=right | 2.8 km || 
|-id=690 bgcolor=#fefefe
| 87690 ||  || — || September 21, 2000 || Socorro || LINEAR || — || align=right | 3.6 km || 
|-id=691 bgcolor=#E9E9E9
| 87691 ||  || — || September 21, 2000 || Socorro || LINEAR || — || align=right | 3.1 km || 
|-id=692 bgcolor=#d6d6d6
| 87692 ||  || — || September 21, 2000 || Socorro || LINEAR || — || align=right | 5.2 km || 
|-id=693 bgcolor=#E9E9E9
| 87693 ||  || — || September 21, 2000 || Socorro || LINEAR || — || align=right | 2.5 km || 
|-id=694 bgcolor=#E9E9E9
| 87694 ||  || — || September 22, 2000 || Socorro || LINEAR || — || align=right | 3.2 km || 
|-id=695 bgcolor=#d6d6d6
| 87695 ||  || — || September 23, 2000 || Socorro || LINEAR || — || align=right | 9.4 km || 
|-id=696 bgcolor=#E9E9E9
| 87696 ||  || — || September 23, 2000 || Socorro || LINEAR || ADE || align=right | 5.9 km || 
|-id=697 bgcolor=#E9E9E9
| 87697 ||  || — || September 23, 2000 || Socorro || LINEAR || — || align=right | 8.9 km || 
|-id=698 bgcolor=#E9E9E9
| 87698 ||  || — || September 23, 2000 || Socorro || LINEAR || — || align=right | 2.6 km || 
|-id=699 bgcolor=#E9E9E9
| 87699 ||  || — || September 23, 2000 || Socorro || LINEAR || WIT || align=right | 2.4 km || 
|-id=700 bgcolor=#E9E9E9
| 87700 ||  || — || September 23, 2000 || Socorro || LINEAR || — || align=right | 2.3 km || 
|}

87701–87800 

|-bgcolor=#d6d6d6
| 87701 ||  || — || September 23, 2000 || Socorro || LINEAR || — || align=right | 5.9 km || 
|-id=702 bgcolor=#E9E9E9
| 87702 ||  || — || September 20, 2000 || Haleakala || NEAT || EUN || align=right | 2.9 km || 
|-id=703 bgcolor=#d6d6d6
| 87703 ||  || — || September 25, 2000 || Višnjan Observatory || K. Korlević || THM || align=right | 6.4 km || 
|-id=704 bgcolor=#d6d6d6
| 87704 ||  || — || September 26, 2000 || Višnjan Observatory || K. Korlević || 3:2 || align=right | 8.9 km || 
|-id=705 bgcolor=#E9E9E9
| 87705 ||  || — || September 26, 2000 || Bisei SG Center || BATTeRS || — || align=right | 4.9 km || 
|-id=706 bgcolor=#E9E9E9
| 87706 ||  || — || September 23, 2000 || Socorro || LINEAR || — || align=right | 5.2 km || 
|-id=707 bgcolor=#E9E9E9
| 87707 ||  || — || September 23, 2000 || Socorro || LINEAR || — || align=right | 5.2 km || 
|-id=708 bgcolor=#d6d6d6
| 87708 ||  || — || September 23, 2000 || Socorro || LINEAR || — || align=right | 6.3 km || 
|-id=709 bgcolor=#E9E9E9
| 87709 ||  || — || September 23, 2000 || Socorro || LINEAR || — || align=right | 3.7 km || 
|-id=710 bgcolor=#d6d6d6
| 87710 ||  || — || September 23, 2000 || Socorro || LINEAR || TIR || align=right | 3.4 km || 
|-id=711 bgcolor=#E9E9E9
| 87711 ||  || — || September 24, 2000 || Socorro || LINEAR || — || align=right | 3.3 km || 
|-id=712 bgcolor=#E9E9E9
| 87712 ||  || — || September 24, 2000 || Socorro || LINEAR || — || align=right | 3.1 km || 
|-id=713 bgcolor=#E9E9E9
| 87713 ||  || — || September 24, 2000 || Socorro || LINEAR || — || align=right | 2.7 km || 
|-id=714 bgcolor=#E9E9E9
| 87714 ||  || — || September 24, 2000 || Socorro || LINEAR || HOF || align=right | 5.7 km || 
|-id=715 bgcolor=#E9E9E9
| 87715 ||  || — || September 24, 2000 || Socorro || LINEAR || HNS || align=right | 2.5 km || 
|-id=716 bgcolor=#E9E9E9
| 87716 ||  || — || September 24, 2000 || Socorro || LINEAR || — || align=right | 3.2 km || 
|-id=717 bgcolor=#E9E9E9
| 87717 ||  || — || September 24, 2000 || Socorro || LINEAR || — || align=right | 4.2 km || 
|-id=718 bgcolor=#E9E9E9
| 87718 ||  || — || September 25, 2000 || Črni Vrh || Črni Vrh || — || align=right | 3.1 km || 
|-id=719 bgcolor=#E9E9E9
| 87719 ||  || — || September 22, 2000 || Socorro || LINEAR || — || align=right | 3.5 km || 
|-id=720 bgcolor=#E9E9E9
| 87720 ||  || — || September 22, 2000 || Socorro || LINEAR || — || align=right | 2.9 km || 
|-id=721 bgcolor=#E9E9E9
| 87721 ||  || — || September 22, 2000 || Socorro || LINEAR || — || align=right | 8.1 km || 
|-id=722 bgcolor=#E9E9E9
| 87722 ||  || — || September 22, 2000 || Socorro || LINEAR || KAZ || align=right | 4.6 km || 
|-id=723 bgcolor=#E9E9E9
| 87723 ||  || — || September 22, 2000 || Socorro || LINEAR || — || align=right | 2.5 km || 
|-id=724 bgcolor=#E9E9E9
| 87724 ||  || — || September 22, 2000 || Socorro || LINEAR || — || align=right | 4.2 km || 
|-id=725 bgcolor=#E9E9E9
| 87725 ||  || — || September 23, 2000 || Socorro || LINEAR || — || align=right | 3.5 km || 
|-id=726 bgcolor=#E9E9E9
| 87726 ||  || — || September 23, 2000 || Socorro || LINEAR || — || align=right | 3.4 km || 
|-id=727 bgcolor=#d6d6d6
| 87727 ||  || — || September 23, 2000 || Socorro || LINEAR || NAE || align=right | 6.7 km || 
|-id=728 bgcolor=#E9E9E9
| 87728 ||  || — || September 23, 2000 || Socorro || LINEAR || EUN || align=right | 3.0 km || 
|-id=729 bgcolor=#E9E9E9
| 87729 ||  || — || September 23, 2000 || Socorro || LINEAR || — || align=right | 4.4 km || 
|-id=730 bgcolor=#d6d6d6
| 87730 ||  || — || September 23, 2000 || Socorro || LINEAR || — || align=right | 6.4 km || 
|-id=731 bgcolor=#d6d6d6
| 87731 ||  || — || September 24, 2000 || Socorro || LINEAR || — || align=right | 6.4 km || 
|-id=732 bgcolor=#E9E9E9
| 87732 ||  || — || September 24, 2000 || Socorro || LINEAR || — || align=right | 4.6 km || 
|-id=733 bgcolor=#E9E9E9
| 87733 ||  || — || September 24, 2000 || Socorro || LINEAR || WIT || align=right | 2.1 km || 
|-id=734 bgcolor=#E9E9E9
| 87734 ||  || — || September 24, 2000 || Socorro || LINEAR || — || align=right | 2.2 km || 
|-id=735 bgcolor=#E9E9E9
| 87735 ||  || — || September 24, 2000 || Socorro || LINEAR || HEN || align=right | 2.3 km || 
|-id=736 bgcolor=#E9E9E9
| 87736 ||  || — || September 24, 2000 || Socorro || LINEAR || — || align=right | 3.3 km || 
|-id=737 bgcolor=#E9E9E9
| 87737 ||  || — || September 24, 2000 || Socorro || LINEAR || — || align=right | 2.4 km || 
|-id=738 bgcolor=#E9E9E9
| 87738 ||  || — || September 24, 2000 || Socorro || LINEAR || HEN || align=right | 2.5 km || 
|-id=739 bgcolor=#E9E9E9
| 87739 ||  || — || September 24, 2000 || Socorro || LINEAR || — || align=right | 3.1 km || 
|-id=740 bgcolor=#E9E9E9
| 87740 ||  || — || September 24, 2000 || Socorro || LINEAR || HOF || align=right | 6.1 km || 
|-id=741 bgcolor=#E9E9E9
| 87741 ||  || — || September 24, 2000 || Socorro || LINEAR || — || align=right | 2.5 km || 
|-id=742 bgcolor=#E9E9E9
| 87742 ||  || — || September 24, 2000 || Socorro || LINEAR || — || align=right | 2.7 km || 
|-id=743 bgcolor=#d6d6d6
| 87743 ||  || — || September 24, 2000 || Socorro || LINEAR || EOS || align=right | 4.7 km || 
|-id=744 bgcolor=#E9E9E9
| 87744 ||  || — || September 24, 2000 || Socorro || LINEAR || WIT || align=right | 2.5 km || 
|-id=745 bgcolor=#d6d6d6
| 87745 ||  || — || September 24, 2000 || Socorro || LINEAR || THM || align=right | 5.4 km || 
|-id=746 bgcolor=#d6d6d6
| 87746 ||  || — || September 24, 2000 || Socorro || LINEAR || — || align=right | 4.8 km || 
|-id=747 bgcolor=#E9E9E9
| 87747 ||  || — || September 24, 2000 || Socorro || LINEAR || — || align=right | 5.9 km || 
|-id=748 bgcolor=#E9E9E9
| 87748 ||  || — || September 24, 2000 || Socorro || LINEAR || — || align=right | 3.0 km || 
|-id=749 bgcolor=#E9E9E9
| 87749 ||  || — || September 24, 2000 || Socorro || LINEAR || GEF || align=right | 2.8 km || 
|-id=750 bgcolor=#E9E9E9
| 87750 ||  || — || September 24, 2000 || Socorro || LINEAR || — || align=right | 4.4 km || 
|-id=751 bgcolor=#E9E9E9
| 87751 ||  || — || September 24, 2000 || Socorro || LINEAR || — || align=right | 2.7 km || 
|-id=752 bgcolor=#E9E9E9
| 87752 ||  || — || September 24, 2000 || Socorro || LINEAR || — || align=right | 5.5 km || 
|-id=753 bgcolor=#E9E9E9
| 87753 ||  || — || September 24, 2000 || Socorro || LINEAR || — || align=right | 2.6 km || 
|-id=754 bgcolor=#E9E9E9
| 87754 ||  || — || September 24, 2000 || Socorro || LINEAR || — || align=right | 2.8 km || 
|-id=755 bgcolor=#d6d6d6
| 87755 ||  || — || September 24, 2000 || Socorro || LINEAR || — || align=right | 6.3 km || 
|-id=756 bgcolor=#E9E9E9
| 87756 ||  || — || September 24, 2000 || Socorro || LINEAR || — || align=right | 5.0 km || 
|-id=757 bgcolor=#E9E9E9
| 87757 ||  || — || September 24, 2000 || Socorro || LINEAR || — || align=right | 5.3 km || 
|-id=758 bgcolor=#E9E9E9
| 87758 ||  || — || September 24, 2000 || Socorro || LINEAR || — || align=right | 5.3 km || 
|-id=759 bgcolor=#d6d6d6
| 87759 ||  || — || September 24, 2000 || Socorro || LINEAR || HYG || align=right | 6.9 km || 
|-id=760 bgcolor=#E9E9E9
| 87760 ||  || — || September 24, 2000 || Socorro || LINEAR || — || align=right | 4.9 km || 
|-id=761 bgcolor=#E9E9E9
| 87761 ||  || — || September 22, 2000 || Socorro || LINEAR || — || align=right | 3.2 km || 
|-id=762 bgcolor=#d6d6d6
| 87762 ||  || — || September 29, 2000 || Nacogdoches || W. D. Bruton, G. Rodgers || — || align=right | 4.7 km || 
|-id=763 bgcolor=#E9E9E9
| 87763 ||  || — || September 22, 2000 || Socorro || LINEAR || MAR || align=right | 3.0 km || 
|-id=764 bgcolor=#d6d6d6
| 87764 ||  || — || September 22, 2000 || Socorro || LINEAR || ALA || align=right | 9.5 km || 
|-id=765 bgcolor=#d6d6d6
| 87765 ||  || — || September 22, 2000 || Socorro || LINEAR || — || align=right | 7.2 km || 
|-id=766 bgcolor=#E9E9E9
| 87766 ||  || — || September 23, 2000 || Socorro || LINEAR || EUN || align=right | 2.5 km || 
|-id=767 bgcolor=#d6d6d6
| 87767 ||  || — || September 23, 2000 || Socorro || LINEAR || — || align=right | 6.3 km || 
|-id=768 bgcolor=#d6d6d6
| 87768 ||  || — || September 23, 2000 || Socorro || LINEAR || — || align=right | 6.9 km || 
|-id=769 bgcolor=#d6d6d6
| 87769 ||  || — || September 23, 2000 || Socorro || LINEAR || — || align=right | 6.1 km || 
|-id=770 bgcolor=#d6d6d6
| 87770 ||  || — || September 23, 2000 || Socorro || LINEAR || — || align=right | 4.6 km || 
|-id=771 bgcolor=#E9E9E9
| 87771 ||  || — || September 23, 2000 || Socorro || LINEAR || — || align=right | 4.4 km || 
|-id=772 bgcolor=#E9E9E9
| 87772 ||  || — || September 23, 2000 || Socorro || LINEAR || — || align=right | 2.2 km || 
|-id=773 bgcolor=#E9E9E9
| 87773 ||  || — || September 23, 2000 || Socorro || LINEAR || — || align=right | 3.0 km || 
|-id=774 bgcolor=#E9E9E9
| 87774 ||  || — || September 23, 2000 || Socorro || LINEAR || PAD || align=right | 3.1 km || 
|-id=775 bgcolor=#E9E9E9
| 87775 ||  || — || September 23, 2000 || Socorro || LINEAR || — || align=right | 3.4 km || 
|-id=776 bgcolor=#E9E9E9
| 87776 ||  || — || September 24, 2000 || Socorro || LINEAR || HOF || align=right | 5.7 km || 
|-id=777 bgcolor=#E9E9E9
| 87777 ||  || — || September 24, 2000 || Socorro || LINEAR || — || align=right | 4.1 km || 
|-id=778 bgcolor=#E9E9E9
| 87778 ||  || — || September 24, 2000 || Socorro || LINEAR || HOF || align=right | 5.8 km || 
|-id=779 bgcolor=#E9E9E9
| 87779 ||  || — || September 24, 2000 || Socorro || LINEAR || HEN || align=right | 2.5 km || 
|-id=780 bgcolor=#d6d6d6
| 87780 ||  || — || September 24, 2000 || Socorro || LINEAR || — || align=right | 6.8 km || 
|-id=781 bgcolor=#E9E9E9
| 87781 ||  || — || September 24, 2000 || Socorro || LINEAR || — || align=right | 4.1 km || 
|-id=782 bgcolor=#E9E9E9
| 87782 ||  || — || September 24, 2000 || Socorro || LINEAR || — || align=right | 6.9 km || 
|-id=783 bgcolor=#E9E9E9
| 87783 ||  || — || September 24, 2000 || Socorro || LINEAR || — || align=right | 2.2 km || 
|-id=784 bgcolor=#E9E9E9
| 87784 ||  || — || September 24, 2000 || Socorro || LINEAR || MRX || align=right | 2.9 km || 
|-id=785 bgcolor=#E9E9E9
| 87785 ||  || — || September 24, 2000 || Socorro || LINEAR || — || align=right | 2.2 km || 
|-id=786 bgcolor=#E9E9E9
| 87786 ||  || — || September 24, 2000 || Socorro || LINEAR || — || align=right | 2.1 km || 
|-id=787 bgcolor=#E9E9E9
| 87787 ||  || — || September 24, 2000 || Socorro || LINEAR || — || align=right | 2.4 km || 
|-id=788 bgcolor=#E9E9E9
| 87788 ||  || — || September 24, 2000 || Socorro || LINEAR || AEO || align=right | 3.0 km || 
|-id=789 bgcolor=#d6d6d6
| 87789 ||  || — || September 24, 2000 || Socorro || LINEAR || 7:4 || align=right | 10 km || 
|-id=790 bgcolor=#E9E9E9
| 87790 ||  || — || September 24, 2000 || Socorro || LINEAR || — || align=right | 4.2 km || 
|-id=791 bgcolor=#E9E9E9
| 87791 ||  || — || September 24, 2000 || Socorro || LINEAR || MRX || align=right | 2.6 km || 
|-id=792 bgcolor=#E9E9E9
| 87792 ||  || — || September 24, 2000 || Socorro || LINEAR || — || align=right | 3.0 km || 
|-id=793 bgcolor=#E9E9E9
| 87793 ||  || — || September 24, 2000 || Socorro || LINEAR || — || align=right | 3.6 km || 
|-id=794 bgcolor=#E9E9E9
| 87794 ||  || — || September 24, 2000 || Socorro || LINEAR || — || align=right | 2.9 km || 
|-id=795 bgcolor=#d6d6d6
| 87795 ||  || — || September 24, 2000 || Socorro || LINEAR || — || align=right | 7.0 km || 
|-id=796 bgcolor=#d6d6d6
| 87796 ||  || — || September 24, 2000 || Socorro || LINEAR || KOR || align=right | 3.2 km || 
|-id=797 bgcolor=#d6d6d6
| 87797 ||  || — || September 22, 2000 || Socorro || LINEAR || — || align=right | 5.9 km || 
|-id=798 bgcolor=#E9E9E9
| 87798 ||  || — || September 22, 2000 || Socorro || LINEAR || MAR || align=right | 2.9 km || 
|-id=799 bgcolor=#E9E9E9
| 87799 ||  || — || September 22, 2000 || Socorro || LINEAR || EUN || align=right | 3.3 km || 
|-id=800 bgcolor=#E9E9E9
| 87800 ||  || — || September 22, 2000 || Socorro || LINEAR || EUN || align=right | 2.4 km || 
|}

87801–87900 

|-bgcolor=#d6d6d6
| 87801 ||  || — || September 22, 2000 || Socorro || LINEAR || — || align=right | 7.9 km || 
|-id=802 bgcolor=#E9E9E9
| 87802 ||  || — || September 22, 2000 || Socorro || LINEAR || MAR || align=right | 2.9 km || 
|-id=803 bgcolor=#E9E9E9
| 87803 ||  || — || September 23, 2000 || Socorro || LINEAR || EUN || align=right | 3.0 km || 
|-id=804 bgcolor=#E9E9E9
| 87804 ||  || — || September 23, 2000 || Socorro || LINEAR || EUN || align=right | 3.1 km || 
|-id=805 bgcolor=#E9E9E9
| 87805 ||  || — || September 23, 2000 || Socorro || LINEAR || — || align=right | 5.5 km || 
|-id=806 bgcolor=#E9E9E9
| 87806 ||  || — || September 23, 2000 || Socorro || LINEAR || — || align=right | 4.3 km || 
|-id=807 bgcolor=#E9E9E9
| 87807 ||  || — || September 23, 2000 || Socorro || LINEAR || — || align=right | 4.6 km || 
|-id=808 bgcolor=#d6d6d6
| 87808 ||  || — || September 23, 2000 || Socorro || LINEAR || — || align=right | 6.6 km || 
|-id=809 bgcolor=#d6d6d6
| 87809 ||  || — || September 23, 2000 || Socorro || LINEAR || HYG || align=right | 6.4 km || 
|-id=810 bgcolor=#E9E9E9
| 87810 ||  || — || September 24, 2000 || Socorro || LINEAR || — || align=right | 2.6 km || 
|-id=811 bgcolor=#d6d6d6
| 87811 ||  || — || September 24, 2000 || Socorro || LINEAR || 3:2 || align=right | 12 km || 
|-id=812 bgcolor=#d6d6d6
| 87812 ||  || — || September 24, 2000 || Socorro || LINEAR || TIR || align=right | 6.6 km || 
|-id=813 bgcolor=#d6d6d6
| 87813 ||  || — || September 24, 2000 || Socorro || LINEAR || HYG || align=right | 6.1 km || 
|-id=814 bgcolor=#d6d6d6
| 87814 ||  || — || September 24, 2000 || Socorro || LINEAR || — || align=right | 6.4 km || 
|-id=815 bgcolor=#E9E9E9
| 87815 ||  || — || September 24, 2000 || Socorro || LINEAR || — || align=right | 3.2 km || 
|-id=816 bgcolor=#d6d6d6
| 87816 ||  || — || September 24, 2000 || Socorro || LINEAR || HYG || align=right | 6.8 km || 
|-id=817 bgcolor=#E9E9E9
| 87817 ||  || — || September 26, 2000 || Socorro || LINEAR || — || align=right | 3.7 km || 
|-id=818 bgcolor=#E9E9E9
| 87818 ||  || — || September 27, 2000 || Socorro || LINEAR || WIT || align=right | 2.0 km || 
|-id=819 bgcolor=#d6d6d6
| 87819 ||  || — || September 20, 2000 || Haleakala || NEAT || — || align=right | 5.7 km || 
|-id=820 bgcolor=#E9E9E9
| 87820 ||  || — || September 20, 2000 || Haleakala || NEAT || — || align=right | 2.7 km || 
|-id=821 bgcolor=#E9E9E9
| 87821 ||  || — || September 30, 2000 || Elmira || A. J. Cecce || RAF || align=right | 3.8 km || 
|-id=822 bgcolor=#E9E9E9
| 87822 ||  || — || September 23, 2000 || Socorro || LINEAR || — || align=right | 6.8 km || 
|-id=823 bgcolor=#E9E9E9
| 87823 ||  || — || September 23, 2000 || Socorro || LINEAR || GEF || align=right | 2.6 km || 
|-id=824 bgcolor=#E9E9E9
| 87824 ||  || — || September 23, 2000 || Socorro || LINEAR || — || align=right | 5.5 km || 
|-id=825 bgcolor=#E9E9E9
| 87825 ||  || — || September 23, 2000 || Socorro || LINEAR || GEF || align=right | 2.4 km || 
|-id=826 bgcolor=#E9E9E9
| 87826 ||  || — || September 23, 2000 || Socorro || LINEAR || — || align=right | 6.0 km || 
|-id=827 bgcolor=#E9E9E9
| 87827 ||  || — || September 24, 2000 || Socorro || LINEAR || — || align=right | 6.9 km || 
|-id=828 bgcolor=#E9E9E9
| 87828 ||  || — || September 24, 2000 || Socorro || LINEAR || INO || align=right | 2.9 km || 
|-id=829 bgcolor=#E9E9E9
| 87829 ||  || — || September 28, 2000 || Socorro || LINEAR || HNS || align=right | 3.6 km || 
|-id=830 bgcolor=#E9E9E9
| 87830 ||  || — || September 28, 2000 || Socorro || LINEAR || — || align=right | 5.8 km || 
|-id=831 bgcolor=#E9E9E9
| 87831 ||  || — || September 28, 2000 || Socorro || LINEAR || RAF || align=right | 2.2 km || 
|-id=832 bgcolor=#d6d6d6
| 87832 ||  || — || September 28, 2000 || Socorro || LINEAR || — || align=right | 6.3 km || 
|-id=833 bgcolor=#E9E9E9
| 87833 ||  || — || September 28, 2000 || Socorro || LINEAR || — || align=right | 6.2 km || 
|-id=834 bgcolor=#E9E9E9
| 87834 ||  || — || September 28, 2000 || Socorro || LINEAR || — || align=right | 4.0 km || 
|-id=835 bgcolor=#E9E9E9
| 87835 ||  || — || September 20, 2000 || Socorro || LINEAR || — || align=right | 2.2 km || 
|-id=836 bgcolor=#d6d6d6
| 87836 ||  || — || September 20, 2000 || Haleakala || NEAT || — || align=right | 6.6 km || 
|-id=837 bgcolor=#E9E9E9
| 87837 ||  || — || September 21, 2000 || Haleakala || NEAT || — || align=right | 2.7 km || 
|-id=838 bgcolor=#E9E9E9
| 87838 ||  || — || September 21, 2000 || Haleakala || NEAT || EUN || align=right | 2.9 km || 
|-id=839 bgcolor=#E9E9E9
| 87839 ||  || — || September 23, 2000 || Socorro || LINEAR || HOF || align=right | 4.9 km || 
|-id=840 bgcolor=#E9E9E9
| 87840 ||  || — || September 24, 2000 || Socorro || LINEAR || — || align=right | 3.3 km || 
|-id=841 bgcolor=#E9E9E9
| 87841 ||  || — || September 24, 2000 || Socorro || LINEAR || HEN || align=right | 2.4 km || 
|-id=842 bgcolor=#E9E9E9
| 87842 ||  || — || September 24, 2000 || Socorro || LINEAR || — || align=right | 4.4 km || 
|-id=843 bgcolor=#E9E9E9
| 87843 ||  || — || September 24, 2000 || Socorro || LINEAR || GEF || align=right | 2.5 km || 
|-id=844 bgcolor=#d6d6d6
| 87844 ||  || — || September 24, 2000 || Socorro || LINEAR || — || align=right | 4.9 km || 
|-id=845 bgcolor=#d6d6d6
| 87845 ||  || — || September 24, 2000 || Socorro || LINEAR || — || align=right | 4.2 km || 
|-id=846 bgcolor=#E9E9E9
| 87846 ||  || — || September 25, 2000 || Socorro || LINEAR || — || align=right | 4.5 km || 
|-id=847 bgcolor=#d6d6d6
| 87847 ||  || — || September 25, 2000 || Socorro || LINEAR || — || align=right | 6.8 km || 
|-id=848 bgcolor=#d6d6d6
| 87848 ||  || — || September 25, 2000 || Socorro || LINEAR || — || align=right | 6.2 km || 
|-id=849 bgcolor=#d6d6d6
| 87849 ||  || — || September 25, 2000 || Socorro || LINEAR || — || align=right | 5.1 km || 
|-id=850 bgcolor=#E9E9E9
| 87850 ||  || — || September 25, 2000 || Socorro || LINEAR || JUN || align=right | 5.0 km || 
|-id=851 bgcolor=#E9E9E9
| 87851 ||  || — || September 26, 2000 || Socorro || LINEAR || — || align=right | 5.5 km || 
|-id=852 bgcolor=#E9E9E9
| 87852 ||  || — || September 26, 2000 || Socorro || LINEAR || GEF || align=right | 3.6 km || 
|-id=853 bgcolor=#E9E9E9
| 87853 ||  || — || September 26, 2000 || Socorro || LINEAR || — || align=right | 3.0 km || 
|-id=854 bgcolor=#E9E9E9
| 87854 ||  || — || September 26, 2000 || Socorro || LINEAR || GEF || align=right | 3.0 km || 
|-id=855 bgcolor=#E9E9E9
| 87855 ||  || — || September 26, 2000 || Socorro || LINEAR || — || align=right | 2.7 km || 
|-id=856 bgcolor=#E9E9E9
| 87856 ||  || — || September 26, 2000 || Socorro || LINEAR || — || align=right | 4.1 km || 
|-id=857 bgcolor=#E9E9E9
| 87857 ||  || — || September 26, 2000 || Socorro || LINEAR || MIT || align=right | 5.0 km || 
|-id=858 bgcolor=#E9E9E9
| 87858 ||  || — || September 27, 2000 || Socorro || LINEAR || — || align=right | 4.0 km || 
|-id=859 bgcolor=#d6d6d6
| 87859 ||  || — || September 27, 2000 || Socorro || LINEAR || TIR || align=right | 8.3 km || 
|-id=860 bgcolor=#E9E9E9
| 87860 ||  || — || September 27, 2000 || Socorro || LINEAR || — || align=right | 4.9 km || 
|-id=861 bgcolor=#E9E9E9
| 87861 ||  || — || September 28, 2000 || Socorro || LINEAR || — || align=right | 3.0 km || 
|-id=862 bgcolor=#d6d6d6
| 87862 ||  || — || September 30, 2000 || Socorro || LINEAR || CHA || align=right | 5.3 km || 
|-id=863 bgcolor=#d6d6d6
| 87863 ||  || — || September 21, 2000 || Socorro || LINEAR || — || align=right | 8.2 km || 
|-id=864 bgcolor=#E9E9E9
| 87864 ||  || — || September 26, 2000 || Socorro || LINEAR || — || align=right | 4.5 km || 
|-id=865 bgcolor=#E9E9E9
| 87865 ||  || — || September 25, 2000 || Socorro || LINEAR || — || align=right | 2.5 km || 
|-id=866 bgcolor=#E9E9E9
| 87866 ||  || — || September 24, 2000 || Socorro || LINEAR || — || align=right | 3.1 km || 
|-id=867 bgcolor=#d6d6d6
| 87867 ||  || — || September 24, 2000 || Socorro || LINEAR || HYG || align=right | 6.4 km || 
|-id=868 bgcolor=#d6d6d6
| 87868 ||  || — || September 24, 2000 || Socorro || LINEAR || — || align=right | 4.8 km || 
|-id=869 bgcolor=#E9E9E9
| 87869 ||  || — || September 24, 2000 || Socorro || LINEAR || PAD || align=right | 4.9 km || 
|-id=870 bgcolor=#E9E9E9
| 87870 ||  || — || September 24, 2000 || Socorro || LINEAR || AGN || align=right | 2.3 km || 
|-id=871 bgcolor=#E9E9E9
| 87871 ||  || — || September 25, 2000 || Socorro || LINEAR || — || align=right | 4.7 km || 
|-id=872 bgcolor=#E9E9E9
| 87872 ||  || — || September 27, 2000 || Socorro || LINEAR || — || align=right | 5.9 km || 
|-id=873 bgcolor=#d6d6d6
| 87873 ||  || — || September 27, 2000 || Socorro || LINEAR || 628 || align=right | 4.1 km || 
|-id=874 bgcolor=#E9E9E9
| 87874 ||  || — || September 27, 2000 || Socorro || LINEAR || — || align=right | 5.1 km || 
|-id=875 bgcolor=#E9E9E9
| 87875 ||  || — || September 27, 2000 || Socorro || LINEAR || — || align=right | 4.8 km || 
|-id=876 bgcolor=#E9E9E9
| 87876 ||  || — || September 27, 2000 || Socorro || LINEAR || — || align=right | 3.0 km || 
|-id=877 bgcolor=#d6d6d6
| 87877 ||  || — || September 28, 2000 || Socorro || LINEAR || — || align=right | 5.5 km || 
|-id=878 bgcolor=#E9E9E9
| 87878 ||  || — || September 28, 2000 || Socorro || LINEAR || — || align=right | 2.6 km || 
|-id=879 bgcolor=#d6d6d6
| 87879 ||  || — || September 28, 2000 || Socorro || LINEAR || HYG || align=right | 9.0 km || 
|-id=880 bgcolor=#d6d6d6
| 87880 ||  || — || September 30, 2000 || Socorro || LINEAR || — || align=right | 6.4 km || 
|-id=881 bgcolor=#E9E9E9
| 87881 ||  || — || September 30, 2000 || Socorro || LINEAR || — || align=right | 2.7 km || 
|-id=882 bgcolor=#d6d6d6
| 87882 ||  || — || September 30, 2000 || Socorro || LINEAR || EOS || align=right | 4.2 km || 
|-id=883 bgcolor=#d6d6d6
| 87883 ||  || — || September 30, 2000 || Socorro || LINEAR || — || align=right | 8.7 km || 
|-id=884 bgcolor=#E9E9E9
| 87884 ||  || — || September 25, 2000 || Socorro || LINEAR || — || align=right | 5.0 km || 
|-id=885 bgcolor=#E9E9E9
| 87885 ||  || — || September 23, 2000 || Socorro || LINEAR || — || align=right | 2.6 km || 
|-id=886 bgcolor=#E9E9E9
| 87886 ||  || — || September 23, 2000 || Socorro || LINEAR || — || align=right | 3.1 km || 
|-id=887 bgcolor=#E9E9E9
| 87887 ||  || — || September 26, 2000 || Socorro || LINEAR || GEF || align=right | 2.7 km || 
|-id=888 bgcolor=#E9E9E9
| 87888 ||  || — || September 26, 2000 || Socorro || LINEAR || — || align=right | 4.5 km || 
|-id=889 bgcolor=#E9E9E9
| 87889 ||  || — || September 26, 2000 || Socorro || LINEAR || — || align=right | 4.2 km || 
|-id=890 bgcolor=#E9E9E9
| 87890 ||  || — || September 26, 2000 || Socorro || LINEAR || — || align=right | 3.0 km || 
|-id=891 bgcolor=#E9E9E9
| 87891 ||  || — || September 27, 2000 || Socorro || LINEAR || WIT || align=right | 1.8 km || 
|-id=892 bgcolor=#d6d6d6
| 87892 ||  || — || September 27, 2000 || Socorro || LINEAR || NAEslow || align=right | 9.0 km || 
|-id=893 bgcolor=#E9E9E9
| 87893 ||  || — || September 27, 2000 || Socorro || LINEAR || — || align=right | 3.7 km || 
|-id=894 bgcolor=#E9E9E9
| 87894 ||  || — || September 27, 2000 || Socorro || LINEAR || EUN || align=right | 3.8 km || 
|-id=895 bgcolor=#E9E9E9
| 87895 ||  || — || September 28, 2000 || Socorro || LINEAR || — || align=right | 3.6 km || 
|-id=896 bgcolor=#E9E9E9
| 87896 ||  || — || September 28, 2000 || Socorro || LINEAR || — || align=right | 4.2 km || 
|-id=897 bgcolor=#E9E9E9
| 87897 ||  || — || September 28, 2000 || Socorro || LINEAR || — || align=right | 3.9 km || 
|-id=898 bgcolor=#d6d6d6
| 87898 ||  || — || September 30, 2000 || Socorro || LINEAR || VER || align=right | 7.2 km || 
|-id=899 bgcolor=#E9E9E9
| 87899 ||  || — || September 30, 2000 || Socorro || LINEAR || — || align=right | 6.1 km || 
|-id=900 bgcolor=#d6d6d6
| 87900 ||  || — || September 30, 2000 || Socorro || LINEAR || — || align=right | 3.9 km || 
|}

87901–88000 

|-bgcolor=#E9E9E9
| 87901 ||  || — || September 30, 2000 || Socorro || LINEAR || GEF || align=right | 3.3 km || 
|-id=902 bgcolor=#E9E9E9
| 87902 ||  || — || September 30, 2000 || Socorro || LINEAR || — || align=right | 3.6 km || 
|-id=903 bgcolor=#E9E9E9
| 87903 ||  || — || September 30, 2000 || Socorro || LINEAR || — || align=right | 2.6 km || 
|-id=904 bgcolor=#E9E9E9
| 87904 ||  || — || September 24, 2000 || Socorro || LINEAR || — || align=right | 4.3 km || 
|-id=905 bgcolor=#E9E9E9
| 87905 ||  || — || September 26, 2000 || Socorro || LINEAR || — || align=right | 7.9 km || 
|-id=906 bgcolor=#E9E9E9
| 87906 ||  || — || September 26, 2000 || Socorro || LINEAR || HNS || align=right | 2.7 km || 
|-id=907 bgcolor=#E9E9E9
| 87907 ||  || — || September 26, 2000 || Socorro || LINEAR || HNS || align=right | 3.4 km || 
|-id=908 bgcolor=#E9E9E9
| 87908 ||  || — || September 26, 2000 || Socorro || LINEAR || HNS || align=right | 3.9 km || 
|-id=909 bgcolor=#E9E9E9
| 87909 ||  || — || September 27, 2000 || Socorro || LINEAR || — || align=right | 4.8 km || 
|-id=910 bgcolor=#E9E9E9
| 87910 ||  || — || September 27, 2000 || Socorro || LINEAR || EUN || align=right | 3.6 km || 
|-id=911 bgcolor=#E9E9E9
| 87911 ||  || — || September 27, 2000 || Socorro || LINEAR || MAR || align=right | 3.6 km || 
|-id=912 bgcolor=#E9E9E9
| 87912 ||  || — || September 27, 2000 || Socorro || LINEAR || — || align=right | 3.4 km || 
|-id=913 bgcolor=#E9E9E9
| 87913 ||  || — || September 27, 2000 || Socorro || LINEAR || MIT || align=right | 5.0 km || 
|-id=914 bgcolor=#E9E9E9
| 87914 ||  || — || September 27, 2000 || Socorro || LINEAR || — || align=right | 3.3 km || 
|-id=915 bgcolor=#E9E9E9
| 87915 ||  || — || September 28, 2000 || Socorro || LINEAR || — || align=right | 3.6 km || 
|-id=916 bgcolor=#E9E9E9
| 87916 ||  || — || September 28, 2000 || Socorro || LINEAR || — || align=right | 5.5 km || 
|-id=917 bgcolor=#d6d6d6
| 87917 ||  || — || September 30, 2000 || Socorro || LINEAR || — || align=right | 8.0 km || 
|-id=918 bgcolor=#E9E9E9
| 87918 ||  || — || September 30, 2000 || Socorro || LINEAR || — || align=right | 3.1 km || 
|-id=919 bgcolor=#d6d6d6
| 87919 ||  || — || September 30, 2000 || Socorro || LINEAR || — || align=right | 9.0 km || 
|-id=920 bgcolor=#d6d6d6
| 87920 ||  || — || September 30, 2000 || Socorro || LINEAR || — || align=right | 6.9 km || 
|-id=921 bgcolor=#E9E9E9
| 87921 ||  || — || September 30, 2000 || Socorro || LINEAR || — || align=right | 6.2 km || 
|-id=922 bgcolor=#d6d6d6
| 87922 ||  || — || September 29, 2000 || Haleakala || NEAT || — || align=right | 3.7 km || 
|-id=923 bgcolor=#E9E9E9
| 87923 ||  || — || September 26, 2000 || Socorro || LINEAR || — || align=right | 6.7 km || 
|-id=924 bgcolor=#E9E9E9
| 87924 ||  || — || September 26, 2000 || Socorro || LINEAR || — || align=right | 4.9 km || 
|-id=925 bgcolor=#E9E9E9
| 87925 ||  || — || September 26, 2000 || Socorro || LINEAR || — || align=right | 5.8 km || 
|-id=926 bgcolor=#d6d6d6
| 87926 ||  || — || September 27, 2000 || Socorro || LINEAR || EUP || align=right | 12 km || 
|-id=927 bgcolor=#E9E9E9
| 87927 ||  || — || September 28, 2000 || Kitt Peak || Spacewatch || HEN || align=right | 1.5 km || 
|-id=928 bgcolor=#E9E9E9
| 87928 ||  || — || September 30, 2000 || Socorro || LINEAR || — || align=right | 4.3 km || 
|-id=929 bgcolor=#E9E9E9
| 87929 ||  || — || September 28, 2000 || Socorro || LINEAR || — || align=right | 3.5 km || 
|-id=930 bgcolor=#E9E9E9
| 87930 ||  || — || September 26, 2000 || Socorro || LINEAR || — || align=right | 2.3 km || 
|-id=931 bgcolor=#E9E9E9
| 87931 ||  || — || September 26, 2000 || Haleakala || NEAT || EUN || align=right | 2.5 km || 
|-id=932 bgcolor=#E9E9E9
| 87932 ||  || — || September 22, 2000 || Socorro || LINEAR || — || align=right | 4.6 km || 
|-id=933 bgcolor=#E9E9E9
| 87933 ||  || — || September 21, 2000 || Kitt Peak || M. W. Buie || — || align=right | 4.0 km || 
|-id=934 bgcolor=#E9E9E9
| 87934 ||  || — || September 25, 2000 || Socorro || LINEAR || HNS || align=right | 5.5 km || 
|-id=935 bgcolor=#E9E9E9
| 87935 ||  || — || September 25, 2000 || Socorro || LINEAR || HNS || align=right | 4.9 km || 
|-id=936 bgcolor=#E9E9E9
| 87936 ||  || — || September 29, 2000 || Anderson Mesa || LONEOS || — || align=right | 2.4 km || 
|-id=937 bgcolor=#E9E9E9
| 87937 ||  || — || September 29, 2000 || Anderson Mesa || LONEOS || — || align=right | 2.4 km || 
|-id=938 bgcolor=#E9E9E9
| 87938 ||  || — || September 29, 2000 || Anderson Mesa || LONEOS || — || align=right | 4.2 km || 
|-id=939 bgcolor=#E9E9E9
| 87939 ||  || — || September 30, 2000 || Anderson Mesa || LONEOS || — || align=right | 4.2 km || 
|-id=940 bgcolor=#E9E9E9
| 87940 ||  || — || September 29, 2000 || Anderson Mesa || LONEOS || — || align=right | 2.7 km || 
|-id=941 bgcolor=#d6d6d6
| 87941 ||  || — || September 29, 2000 || Anderson Mesa || LONEOS || — || align=right | 5.3 km || 
|-id=942 bgcolor=#E9E9E9
| 87942 ||  || — || September 29, 2000 || Anderson Mesa || LONEOS || MAR || align=right | 2.4 km || 
|-id=943 bgcolor=#E9E9E9
| 87943 ||  || — || September 28, 2000 || Anderson Mesa || LONEOS || EUN || align=right | 2.2 km || 
|-id=944 bgcolor=#d6d6d6
| 87944 ||  || — || September 28, 2000 || Anderson Mesa || LONEOS || URS || align=right | 8.0 km || 
|-id=945 bgcolor=#E9E9E9
| 87945 ||  || — || September 24, 2000 || Haleakala || NEAT || EUN || align=right | 3.5 km || 
|-id=946 bgcolor=#E9E9E9
| 87946 ||  || — || September 26, 2000 || Anderson Mesa || LONEOS || — || align=right | 4.3 km || 
|-id=947 bgcolor=#E9E9E9
| 87947 ||  || — || September 26, 2000 || Haleakala || NEAT || — || align=right | 3.0 km || 
|-id=948 bgcolor=#E9E9E9
| 87948 ||  || — || September 23, 2000 || Anderson Mesa || LONEOS || — || align=right | 4.5 km || 
|-id=949 bgcolor=#E9E9E9
| 87949 ||  || — || September 20, 2000 || Socorro || LINEAR || GEF || align=right | 4.2 km || 
|-id=950 bgcolor=#E9E9E9
| 87950 ||  || — || September 22, 2000 || Socorro || LINEAR || — || align=right | 4.1 km || 
|-id=951 bgcolor=#E9E9E9
| 87951 ||  || — || September 22, 2000 || Anderson Mesa || LONEOS || ADE || align=right | 4.5 km || 
|-id=952 bgcolor=#E9E9E9
| 87952 ||  || — || September 24, 2000 || Anderson Mesa || LONEOS || — || align=right | 1.4 km || 
|-id=953 bgcolor=#E9E9E9
| 87953 ||  || — || September 24, 2000 || Anderson Mesa || LONEOS || — || align=right | 2.8 km || 
|-id=954 bgcolor=#E9E9E9
| 87954 Tomkaye || 2000 TK ||  || October 2, 2000 || Fountain Hills || C. W. Juels || EUN || align=right | 3.4 km || 
|-id=955 bgcolor=#E9E9E9
| 87955 ||  || — || October 1, 2000 || Socorro || LINEAR || MRX || align=right | 2.6 km || 
|-id=956 bgcolor=#d6d6d6
| 87956 ||  || — || October 1, 2000 || Socorro || LINEAR || 3:2 || align=right | 6.9 km || 
|-id=957 bgcolor=#E9E9E9
| 87957 ||  || — || October 1, 2000 || Socorro || LINEAR || WIT || align=right | 2.2 km || 
|-id=958 bgcolor=#E9E9E9
| 87958 ||  || — || October 1, 2000 || Socorro || LINEAR || HOF || align=right | 5.1 km || 
|-id=959 bgcolor=#E9E9E9
| 87959 ||  || — || October 1, 2000 || Socorro || LINEAR || — || align=right | 6.5 km || 
|-id=960 bgcolor=#E9E9E9
| 87960 ||  || — || October 1, 2000 || Socorro || LINEAR || EUN || align=right | 4.0 km || 
|-id=961 bgcolor=#E9E9E9
| 87961 ||  || — || October 1, 2000 || Socorro || LINEAR || — || align=right | 2.3 km || 
|-id=962 bgcolor=#d6d6d6
| 87962 ||  || — || October 1, 2000 || Socorro || LINEAR || VER || align=right | 7.0 km || 
|-id=963 bgcolor=#d6d6d6
| 87963 ||  || — || October 1, 2000 || Socorro || LINEAR || — || align=right | 6.7 km || 
|-id=964 bgcolor=#d6d6d6
| 87964 ||  || — || October 3, 2000 || Socorro || LINEAR || 628 || align=right | 3.8 km || 
|-id=965 bgcolor=#E9E9E9
| 87965 ||  || — || October 6, 2000 || Fountain Hills || C. W. Juels || — || align=right | 5.7 km || 
|-id=966 bgcolor=#E9E9E9
| 87966 ||  || — || October 3, 2000 || Socorro || LINEAR || — || align=right | 4.0 km || 
|-id=967 bgcolor=#E9E9E9
| 87967 ||  || — || October 5, 2000 || Socorro || LINEAR || — || align=right | 5.2 km || 
|-id=968 bgcolor=#E9E9E9
| 87968 ||  || — || October 5, 2000 || Socorro || LINEAR || EUN || align=right | 2.7 km || 
|-id=969 bgcolor=#E9E9E9
| 87969 ||  || — || October 1, 2000 || Socorro || LINEAR || — || align=right | 6.1 km || 
|-id=970 bgcolor=#E9E9E9
| 87970 ||  || — || October 1, 2000 || Socorro || LINEAR || RAF || align=right | 3.3 km || 
|-id=971 bgcolor=#d6d6d6
| 87971 ||  || — || October 1, 2000 || Socorro || LINEAR || URS || align=right | 6.6 km || 
|-id=972 bgcolor=#d6d6d6
| 87972 ||  || — || October 1, 2000 || Socorro || LINEAR || — || align=right | 3.7 km || 
|-id=973 bgcolor=#E9E9E9
| 87973 ||  || — || October 1, 2000 || Socorro || LINEAR || — || align=right | 2.9 km || 
|-id=974 bgcolor=#E9E9E9
| 87974 ||  || — || October 1, 2000 || Socorro || LINEAR || — || align=right | 3.7 km || 
|-id=975 bgcolor=#d6d6d6
| 87975 ||  || — || October 1, 2000 || Socorro || LINEAR || EOS || align=right | 4.7 km || 
|-id=976 bgcolor=#E9E9E9
| 87976 ||  || — || October 1, 2000 || Socorro || LINEAR || — || align=right | 5.4 km || 
|-id=977 bgcolor=#E9E9E9
| 87977 ||  || — || October 1, 2000 || Socorro || LINEAR || — || align=right | 4.2 km || 
|-id=978 bgcolor=#E9E9E9
| 87978 ||  || — || October 1, 2000 || Socorro || LINEAR || — || align=right | 1.6 km || 
|-id=979 bgcolor=#d6d6d6
| 87979 ||  || — || October 1, 2000 || Socorro || LINEAR || EOS || align=right | 4.8 km || 
|-id=980 bgcolor=#E9E9E9
| 87980 ||  || — || October 1, 2000 || Socorro || LINEAR || XIZ || align=right | 2.4 km || 
|-id=981 bgcolor=#E9E9E9
| 87981 ||  || — || October 1, 2000 || Socorro || LINEAR || — || align=right | 3.4 km || 
|-id=982 bgcolor=#E9E9E9
| 87982 ||  || — || October 2, 2000 || Anderson Mesa || LONEOS || MAR || align=right | 2.3 km || 
|-id=983 bgcolor=#d6d6d6
| 87983 ||  || — || October 2, 2000 || Anderson Mesa || LONEOS || EOS || align=right | 3.5 km || 
|-id=984 bgcolor=#E9E9E9
| 87984 ||  || — || October 2, 2000 || Anderson Mesa || LONEOS || — || align=right | 2.0 km || 
|-id=985 bgcolor=#E9E9E9
| 87985 ||  || — || October 2, 2000 || Socorro || LINEAR || — || align=right | 3.0 km || 
|-id=986 bgcolor=#E9E9E9
| 87986 ||  || — || October 2, 2000 || Anderson Mesa || LONEOS || — || align=right | 3.5 km || 
|-id=987 bgcolor=#E9E9E9
| 87987 ||  || — || October 2, 2000 || Anderson Mesa || LONEOS || EUN || align=right | 3.4 km || 
|-id=988 bgcolor=#E9E9E9
| 87988 ||  || — || October 2, 2000 || Socorro || LINEAR || — || align=right | 2.4 km || 
|-id=989 bgcolor=#d6d6d6
| 87989 ||  || — || October 21, 2000 || Desert Beaver || W. K. Y. Yeung || — || align=right | 9.2 km || 
|-id=990 bgcolor=#d6d6d6
| 87990 ||  || — || October 24, 2000 || Socorro || LINEAR || KAR || align=right | 2.7 km || 
|-id=991 bgcolor=#E9E9E9
| 87991 ||  || — || October 24, 2000 || Socorro || LINEAR || — || align=right | 4.6 km || 
|-id=992 bgcolor=#E9E9E9
| 87992 ||  || — || October 24, 2000 || Socorro || LINEAR || — || align=right | 5.3 km || 
|-id=993 bgcolor=#E9E9E9
| 87993 ||  || — || October 24, 2000 || Socorro || LINEAR || — || align=right | 4.8 km || 
|-id=994 bgcolor=#d6d6d6
| 87994 ||  || — || October 25, 2000 || Socorro || LINEAR || EOS || align=right | 4.5 km || 
|-id=995 bgcolor=#E9E9E9
| 87995 ||  || — || October 24, 2000 || Socorro || LINEAR || — || align=right | 4.1 km || 
|-id=996 bgcolor=#E9E9E9
| 87996 ||  || — || October 24, 2000 || Socorro || LINEAR || AGN || align=right | 2.5 km || 
|-id=997 bgcolor=#E9E9E9
| 87997 ||  || — || October 24, 2000 || Socorro || LINEAR || NEM || align=right | 4.5 km || 
|-id=998 bgcolor=#E9E9E9
| 87998 ||  || — || October 25, 2000 || Socorro || LINEAR || — || align=right | 4.3 km || 
|-id=999 bgcolor=#d6d6d6
| 87999 ||  || — || October 30, 2000 || Socorro || LINEAR || — || align=right | 3.1 km || 
|-id=000 bgcolor=#E9E9E9
| 88000 ||  || — || October 24, 2000 || Socorro || LINEAR || — || align=right | 4.6 km || 
|}

References

External links 
 Discovery Circumstances: Numbered Minor Planets (85001)–(90000) (IAU Minor Planet Center)

0087